= Baer =

Baer (or Bär, from German: bear) or Van Baer is a surname. Notable people with the surname include:

== Baer ==
- Abel Baer (1893–1976), American songwriter
- Abraham Baer (1834–1894), German cantor, musician, and composer
- Alan Baer, American tuba player
- Anna Elisabeth Baer (1722–1799), Finnish merchant and shipowner
- Arthur "Bugs" Baer (1886–1969), American journalist and humorist
- Art Baer (1925–2006), American producer and screenwriter
- Asher Baer (died 1897), Russian Jewish mathematician and engraver
- Brett Baer, American television producer and screenwriter
- Buddy Baer (1915–1986), American boxer
- Byron Baer (1929–2007), American politician
- Carl Baer (1918–1996), American basketball player
- Chuck Baer (1905–1987), American football coach
- Cindy Baer, American actress, director, producer, and entrepreneur
- Clara Gregory Baer (1863–1938), American inventor of netball, Newcomb ball and author of first rules of women's basketball
- Dale Baer (1950–2021), American character animator
- Dan Baer (born 1977), American politician and diplomat
- Donald M. Baer (1931–2002), American developmental psychologist
- Édouard Baer (born 1966), French actor and filmmaker
- Elizabeth R. Baer (born 1946), American academic
- Eric Baer (born 1932), American polymer researcher
- Eva Baer (1920–2017), Israeli art historian
- Fred Baer (1932–2007), American football player
- Freddie Baer (1952-2015), American anarchist and collage artist
- Friederike Baer, German-American historian
- Gabriel Baer (1919–1982), Israeli orientalist
- Geoffrey Baer, American television personality, writer, and producer
- George A. Baer (1903–1994), German/Swiss/American bookbinder
- George Baer Jr. (1763–1834), American politician
- George Frederick Baer (1842–1914), American lawyer and executive
- Gertrud Baer (1890–1981), German Jewish women's rights and peace activist
- Greg Baer (born 1962), American public policy executive
- Gretchen Baer (born 1963), American painter and performance artist
- Hanania Baer (born 1943), Israeli cinematographer
- Hannah Baer, American writer, therapist, and cultural critic
- Hans J. Baer (1927–2011), Swiss banker
- Harold Baer (1905–1987), American judge
- Harold Baer Jr. (1933–2014), American judge
- Harry Baer (born 1947), German actor, producer and author
- Herman Baer (1830–1901), German-American writer
- Jack Baer (1914–2002), American college baseball coach
- Jack Baer (art dealer) (1924–2016), British art dealer
- Jane Baer (1934–2026), American animator
- Jean Baer (1902–1975), Swiss parasitologist and environmentalist
- Jean-Loup Baer, French-American computer scientist
- Jo Baer (1929–2025), American painter associated with minimalist art
- Johann Baer, German revolutionary socialist
- John Baer (actor) (1923–2006), American actor, Terry and the Pirates
- John Baer (journalist), American journalist, Philadelphia Daily News
- John Metz Baer, American educational psychologist
- John Miller Baer (1886–1970), American congressman from North Dakota
- John Willis Baer (1861–1931), American Presbyterian leader and college president
- Joseph A. Baer (1878–1958), United States Army general
- Judith A. Baer, American political scientist
- Julie Baer (born 1960), American author and visual artist
- Julius Baer (1857–1922), Swiss banker
- Karl M. Baer (1885–1956), German-Israeli author and activist, first recorded person to undergo transgender sex reassignment surgery
- Kate Baer, American poet
- Kenneth Baer (born 1972), American political advisor and author
- Kent Baer (born 1951), American football coach
- Larry Baer (born 1957), President and chief executive officer of the San Francisco Giants
- Les Baer, founder of Les Baer Custom, Inc
- Libbie C. Riley Baer (1849–1929), American poet
- Marc David Baer, American historian
- Max Baer (boxer) (1909–1959), American boxer
- Max Baer Jr. (born 1937), American actor and director
- Max Baer (judge) (1947–2022), American judge
- Meridith Baer (born 1947), American businesswoman, actress, and screenwriter
- Michael Baer (born 1987), Welsh cricketer
- Mignon Baer, German musician
- Monika Baer (born 1964), German painter
- Moritz Baer (born 1997), German ski jumper
- Morley Baer (1916–1995), American photographer and teacher
- Neal Baer (born 1955), American pediatrician and screenwriter
- Nicolai Reymers Baer (c. 1550–c. 1600), aka Ursus, German mathematician
- Parley Baer (1914–2002), American actor
- Paul Frank Baer (1894–1930), American fighter pilot
- Ralph H. Baer (1922–2014), American inventor
- Ray Baer (1905–1968), American football player
- Reinhold Baer (1902–1979), German mathematician
- Richard Baer (1911–1963), German Nazi SS concentration camp commandant
- Richard Baer (screenwriter) (1928–2008), American screenwriter
- Richard J. Baer (1892–1940), Swiss physicist and banker
- Robert Baer (born 1952), American CIA officer and writer
- Robert J. Baer (1924–2011), United States Army tank general
- Ronni Baer (born 1954), American art historian and curator
- Seligman Baer (1825–1897), German Jewish biblical scholar
- Steve Baer (1938–2024), American inventor
- Steve Baer (political activist), American political activist
- Susan Baer (1950–2016), American public servant, New York transportation manager
- Susanne Baer (born 1964), German judge and legal scholar
- Thomas M. Baer, American physicist
- Thomas S. Baer (1843–1906), American judge
- Virgil Baer (1912–1993), American football and basketball coach
- Vladimir Baer (1853–1905), Russian captain
- Werner Baer (1931–2016), American economist
- Will Christopher Baer (born 1966), American writer
- William Baer (writer) (born 1948), American writer
- William Baer (lawyer) (born 1950), American lawyer
- William Jacob Baer (1860–1941), American painter
- Yitzhak Baer (1888–1980), German-born Israeli historian
- Yuval Baer (born 1958), Israeli architect

== Van Baer ==
- Van Baer (family), Middle Age noble family from the Dutch province of Gelderland
- Frederik Johan van Baer (1645–1713), Dutch officer in the military service of William III of Orange
- Stanny van Baer (born 1942), Dutch model and beauty queen, Miss International 1961

== Von Baer ==
- Bern von Baer (1911–1981), German Wehrmacht officer
- Ena von Baer (born 1974), Chilean journalist and politician
- Karl Ernst von Baer (1792–1876), Estonian biologist

== See also ==
- Baire
- Bare
