= Narcosobrinos affair =

Cocaine smuggling by Venezuelan President Maduro's nephews

- Part of the war on drugs
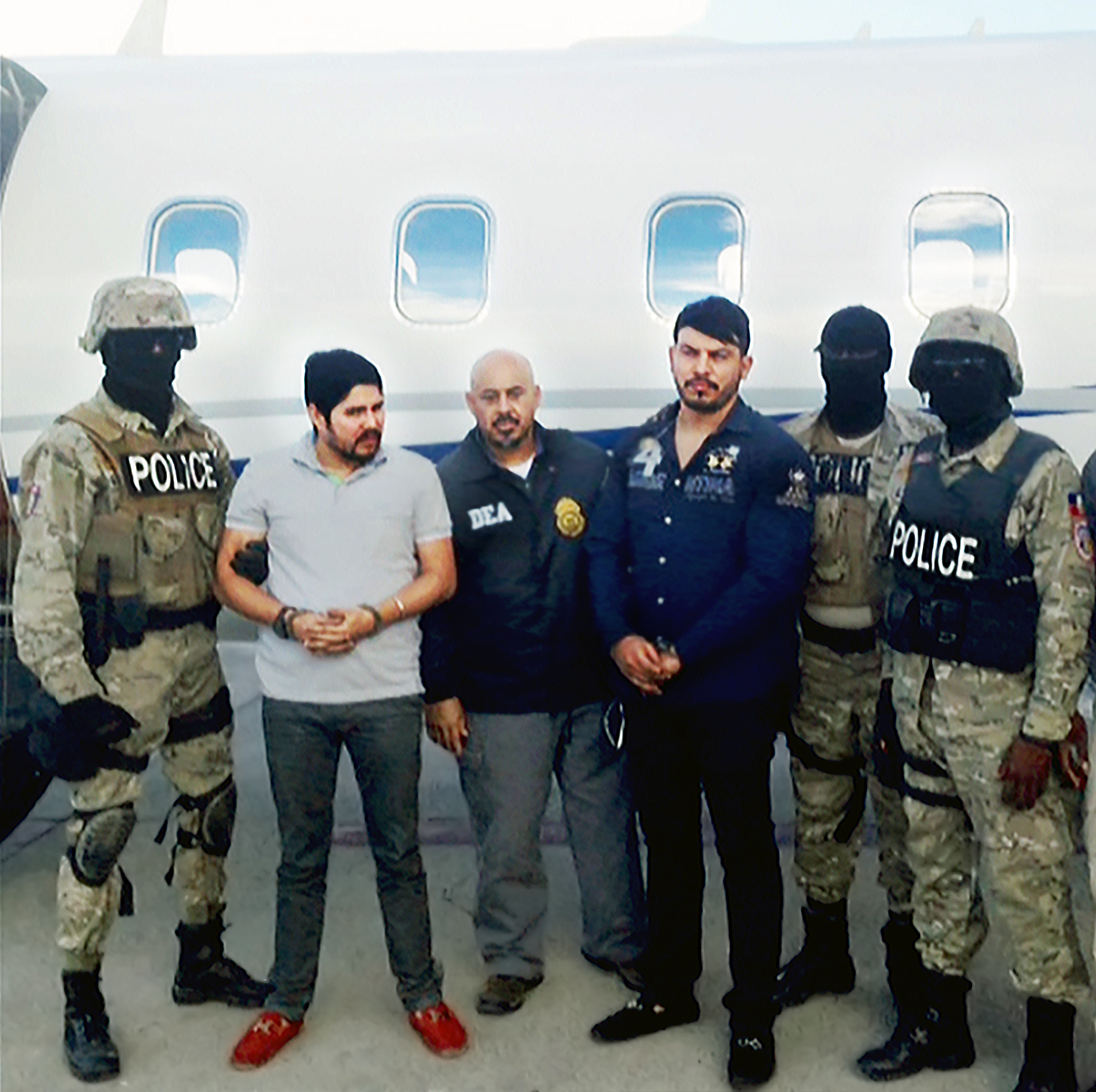
- Campo (second from left) and Flores (third from right) following their arrest
- Date: 10 November 2015
- Location: Port-au-Prince, Haiti
- Suspects: Efraín Antonio Campo Flores, Francisco Flores, Roberto de Jesus Soto Garcia and others.

The Narcosobrinos affair (Spanish for drug trafficker nephews) is the situation of events that surrounded two nephews of Venezuelan President Nicolás Maduro and his wife Cilia Flores who were arrested for narcotics trafficking. The nephews, Efraín Antonio Campo Flores and Francisco Flores de Freitas, were arrested on 10 November 2015 by the United States Drug Enforcement Administration in Port-au-Prince, Haiti after attempting to transport 800 kilograms (1,800 lb) of cocaine into the United States. A year later, on 18 November 2016, the two nephews were found guilty, with the cash allegedly destined to "help their family stay in power". On 14 December 2017, the two were sentenced to 18 years of imprisonment.

In October 2022, Campos and Flores were released and returned to Venezuela as part of a prisoner swap negotiated with United States in which five Venezuelan-American directors of the oil refinery corporation CITGO (collectively known as the Citgo Six), who were imprisoned in Venezuela, were exchanged.

== Etymology ==
The word Narcosobrinos is the word narco, meaning "drug dealer", followed by sobrinos, which translates to "nephews". Its translation could therefore be "drug dealer nephews". The term derived from the media which focused on the relation of drug dealing charges to President Maduro's nephews.

== Background ==
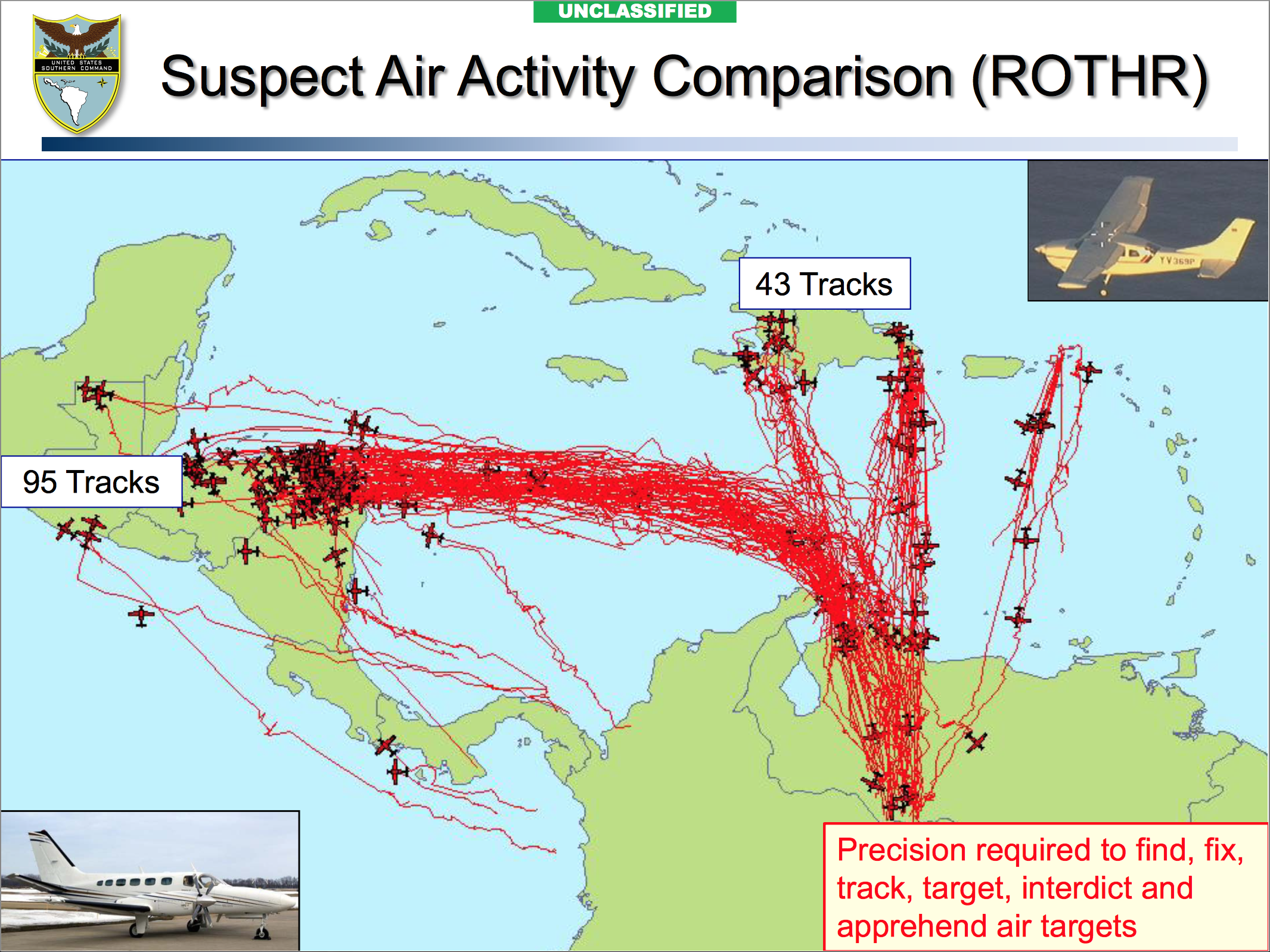
Aircraft activity of drug trafficking suspects primarily from Venezuela tracked by the United States Southern Command showing multiple drug flights to Haiti

According to Jackson Diehl, Deputy Editorial Page Editor of The Washington Post, the Bolivarian government of Venezuela shelters "one of the world's biggest drug cartels". There have been allegations of former president Hugo Chávez being involved with drug trafficking. In May 2015, The Wall Street Journal reported from United States officials that drug trafficking in Venezuela increased significantly with Colombian drug traffickers moving from Colombia to Venezuela due to pressure from law enforcement. One United States Department of Justice official described the higher ranks of the Venezuelan government and military as "a criminal organization", with high ranking Venezuelan officials being accused of drug trafficking. Those involved with investigations stated that Venezuelan government defectors and former traffickers had given information to investigators and that details of those involved in government drug trafficking were increasing. Anti-drug authorities have also accused some Venezuelan officials of working with Mexican drug cartels.

At a presentation at the XXXII International Conference on Drugs in 2015, commander of the United States Southern Command General John Kelly stated that though relations with other Latin American nations countering drug trafficking has been good, Venezuela was not as cooperative and that "there's a lot of cocaine leaving Venezuela to the world market". General Kelly also stated that almost all shipments of cocaine using aircraft comes out of Venezuela and that since 2013 to early-2014, the route of drug trafficking aircraft has changed from heading to Central America to primarily traveling through Caribbean islands. The Narcosobrinos incident happened at a time when multiple high-ranking members of the Venezuelan government were being investigated for their involvement of drug trafficking, including Walter Jacobo Gavidia, Cilia Flores' son who is a Caracas judge, former National Assembly President Diosdado Cabello, and Governor of Aragua State Tarek El Aissami.

== Series of events ==
=== Preparation and DEA monitoring ===
Campo Flores and Flores de Freitas were involved in illicit activities such as drug trafficking and possibly financially assisted President Maduro's presidential campaign in the 2013 Venezuelan presidential election and potentially for the 2015 Venezuelan parliamentary elections. One informant stated that the two would often fly out of Terminal 4 of Simon Bolivar Airport, a terminal reserved for the president.

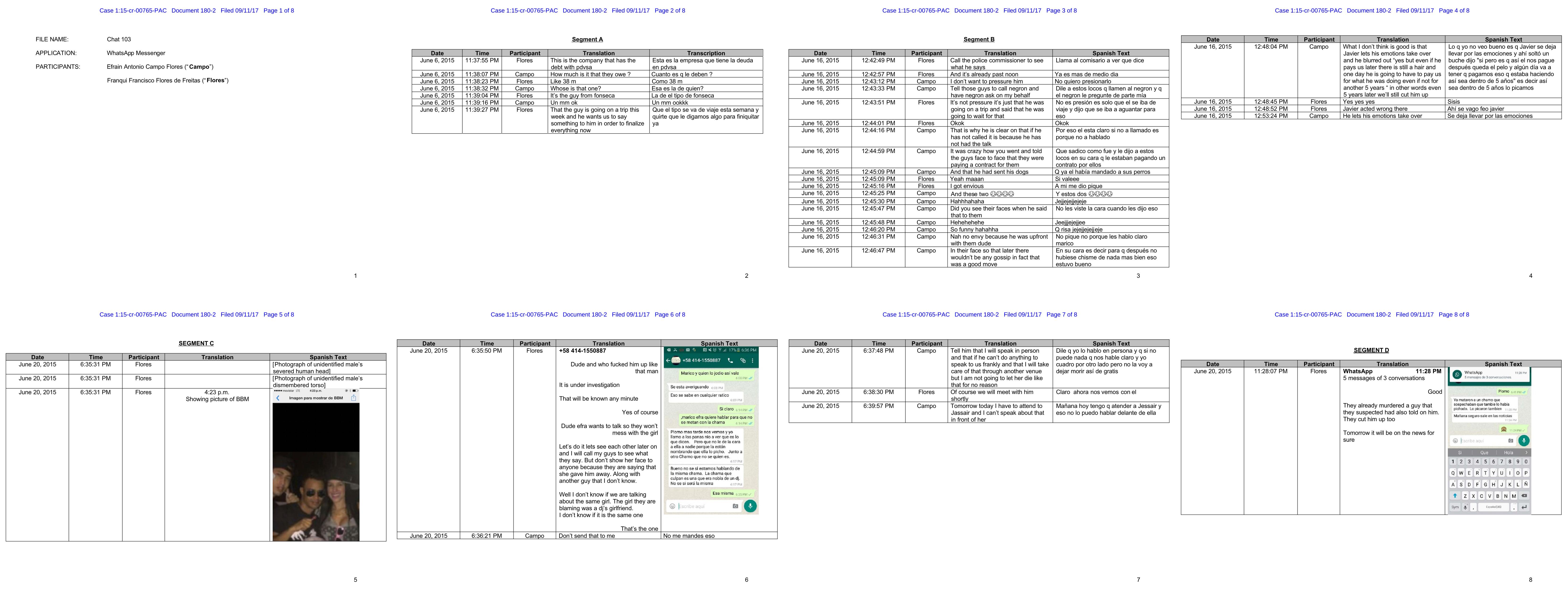
Eight pages of messages between the nephews detailing the murder and dismemberment of an indebted individual Source: United States District Court for the Southern District of New York

The nephews and Drug Enforcement Administration (DEA) informants met on multiple occasions in Haiti, Honduras and Venezuela while every meeting "produced an audio recording plus three to seven videos". Campo and Flores planned to ship cocaine supplied by the Revolutionary Armed Forces of Colombia (FARC) to the United States and sought for assistance with their plans. On 3 October 2015, a confidential DEA informant known as CW-1 and his employee "El Flaco" were contacted by a Venezuelan contact known as "Hamudi" who introduced Campo and Flores to the informant.

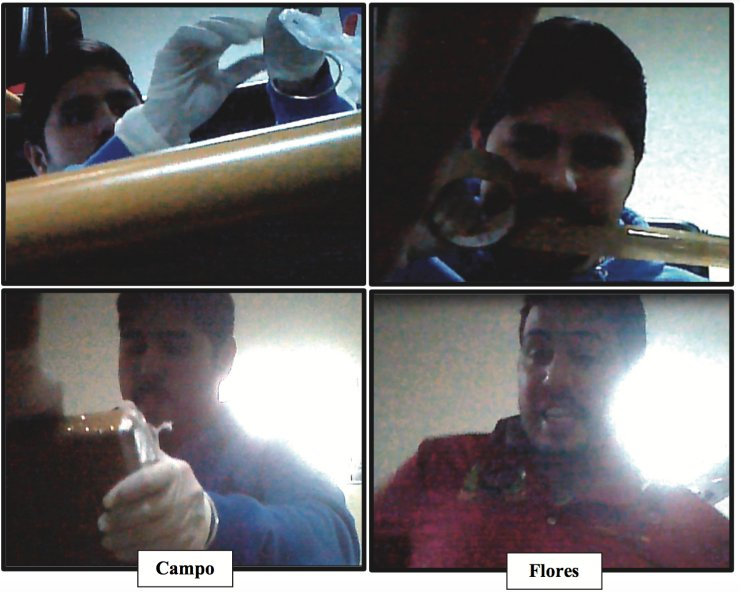
Campo and Flores seen showing the purity of drugs in a secret video during a 27 October 2015 meeting in Caracas, Venezuela with DEA informants

The next day on 4 October 2015, the two flew from Venezuela to San Pedro Sula, Honduras, with nephews stating that they would use their connections to send narcotics on legal flights from Caracas, Venezuela to Roatán, Honduras, knowing that their relation to the president "would open doors for the smuggling operation".

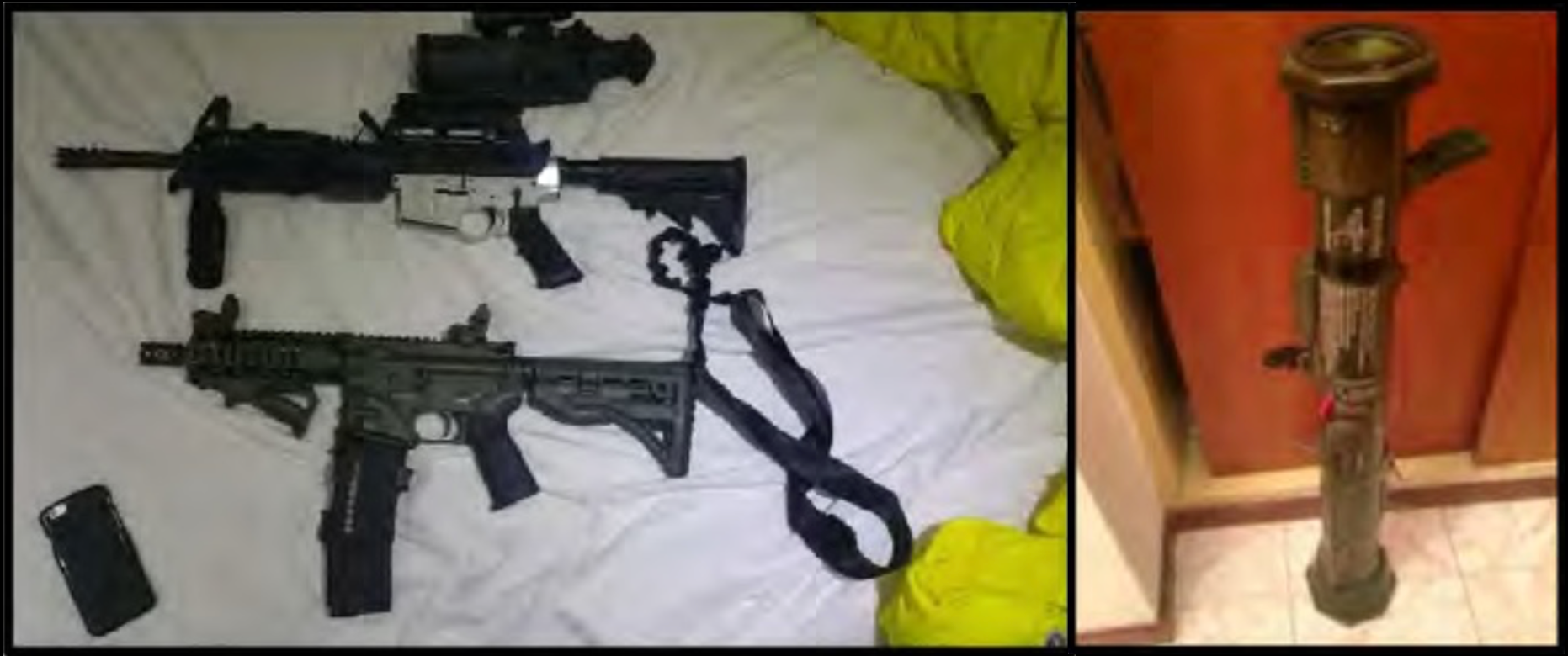
Photos from Campo's phone showing two firearms and an AT4 rocket launcher

In late-October, CS-1, who presented himself as a Mexican drug boss and CS-2, presenting himself as an associate of CS-1, flew to Caracas, Venezuela to meet with the nephews. Around 23 October 2015, CS-1 and CS-2 met with the nephews, with Campo stating that he was "the one in charge" and that "we're at war with the United States ... with Colombia ... with the opposition". Campo also reassured the two informants that the cocaine shipments would not be tracked by law enforcement because the plane would "depart from here as if ... some from our family were on the plane". Days later on 26 October 2015, Campo stated that the two were to ship cocaine and were seeking to raise about $20 million, explaining that CW-1 would be paid about $900,000 to receive the cocaine in Honduras. The next day on 27 October 2015, Campo and Flores presented a kilogram of cocaine to CS-1 and CS-2 to show its purity, with the informants believing that the purity was between 95%-97%. On 5 November 2015, informant CS-3 met with co-defendant Roberto de Jesus Soto Garcia to plan on how to receive the cocaine in Honduras. Soto explained the schedule at the Juan Manuel Gálvez International Airport in Roatán, Honduras and stated that the load of cocaine would then be "arranged with all of those inside of the airport".

=== Arrests ===
==== Campo Flores and Flores de Freites ====
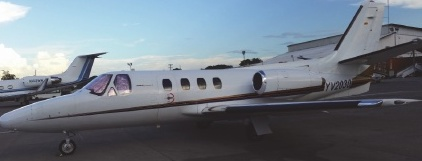
A Cessna Citation 500 private jet registered as YV2030 in Venezuela that flew Campos and Flores into Haiti on 10 November 2015

On 10 November 2015, Campo Flores and Flores de Freites were flown into Port-au-Prince, Haiti by two Venezuelan military personnel accompanied by two presidential honor guards carrying more than 800 kilograms (1,800 lb) of cocaine destined for New York City. The jet was a Cessna Citation 500 that belonged to Lebanese Venezuelan businessmen Majed and Khaled Khalil Majzoun, who were linked to old projects of the Hugo Chávez government and close to high ranking Venezuelan politician Diosdado Cabello. CS-1 met with the nephews at a restaurant of a hotel near Toussaint Louverture International Airport and was supposed to pay them $5 million for the cocaine. CS-1 then left into the bathroom and the Haitian Brigade de Lutte contre le Trafic de Stupéfiants (BLTS) and DEA agents raided the restaurant after identifying themselves, apprehending the nephews. The BLTS personnel wore fatigues and vests that read "POLICE" so they would be able to be identified as well. Campos and Flores were later turned over to the DEA and read their Miranda rights after boarding the DEA plane, being flown directly to Westchester County Airport in White Plains, New York in order to face an immediate trial.

The two were interviewed separately on the DEA plane. Campo stated on the DEA plane that he was the adopted step son of President Maduro and that he grew up in the Maduro household while being raised by Flores. He was also shown a picture of a man with a kilo package of cocaine replying "That's me" and when asked what was in the package he said "You know what it is". The two men possessed Venezuelan diplomatic passports but did not have diplomatic immunity according to former head of DEA international operations Michael Vigil. A later raid of Efraín Antonio Campo Flores' "Casa de Campo" mansion and yacht in the Dominican Republic revealed an additional 280 lb (130 kg) of cocaine and 22 lb (10 kg) of heroin, with 176 lb (80 kg) of the drugs found in the home while the remainder was discovered in his yacht.

Due to the extradition process, New York courts could not apprehend those who assisted the nephews on their way to Haiti, though a pilot was later arrested. It was also stated by those close to the case that there are more sealed warrants linked to the incident.

==== Roberto de Jesús Soto García ====
On 28 October 2016, a Honduran man, Roberto de Jesús Soto García, was arrested in Honduras and extradited to the United States. According to authorities, Soto García was responsible for transporting drug shipments from Juan Manuel Gálvez International Airport. Soto García provided information about the port and was supposed to take the drugs from the nephews into the United States.

==== Aircraft pilot ====
In June 2016, Yazenky Antonio Lamas Rondón, the pilot of the plane which transported the cocaine and the two nephews, was arrested at the El Dorado International Airport in Bogota, Colombia after the DEA and Interpol put out a warrant for his arrest. According to the DEA, Lamas Rondón piloted over 100 flights over the span of a decade from Venezuela which trafficked various drugs throughout Latin America. He is also believed to be involved with the Cartel of the Suns, a group of corrupt drug trafficking Venezuelan officials.

=== Trial ===
The nephews originally plead not guilty to the charges of conspiring to transport cocaine into the United States, with the two facing up to life in prison. In trial papers filed on 1 July 2016, the nephews stated that they were not informed of their rights when detained, attempting to suppress their statements that they made to DEA agents after their arrest. However, on 22 July 2016, their statements made to DEA agents were filed as exhibit by the United States Attorney Office in Manhattan, with the two men confessing to their conspiracy to traffic cocaine into the United States that was supposed to be supplied by the Colombian guerilla group, the Revolutionary Armed Forces of Colombia (FARC). The pair hoped to make $20 million through multiple drug shipments. A confidential informant posing as a leader of the Sinaloa cartel confessions testified that Efrain Campo planned to finance Cilia Flores' congressional campaign.

On 18 November 2016, the jury reached a verdict finding the two nephews guilty of attempting to traffic drugs into the United States.

==== Murdered informants ====
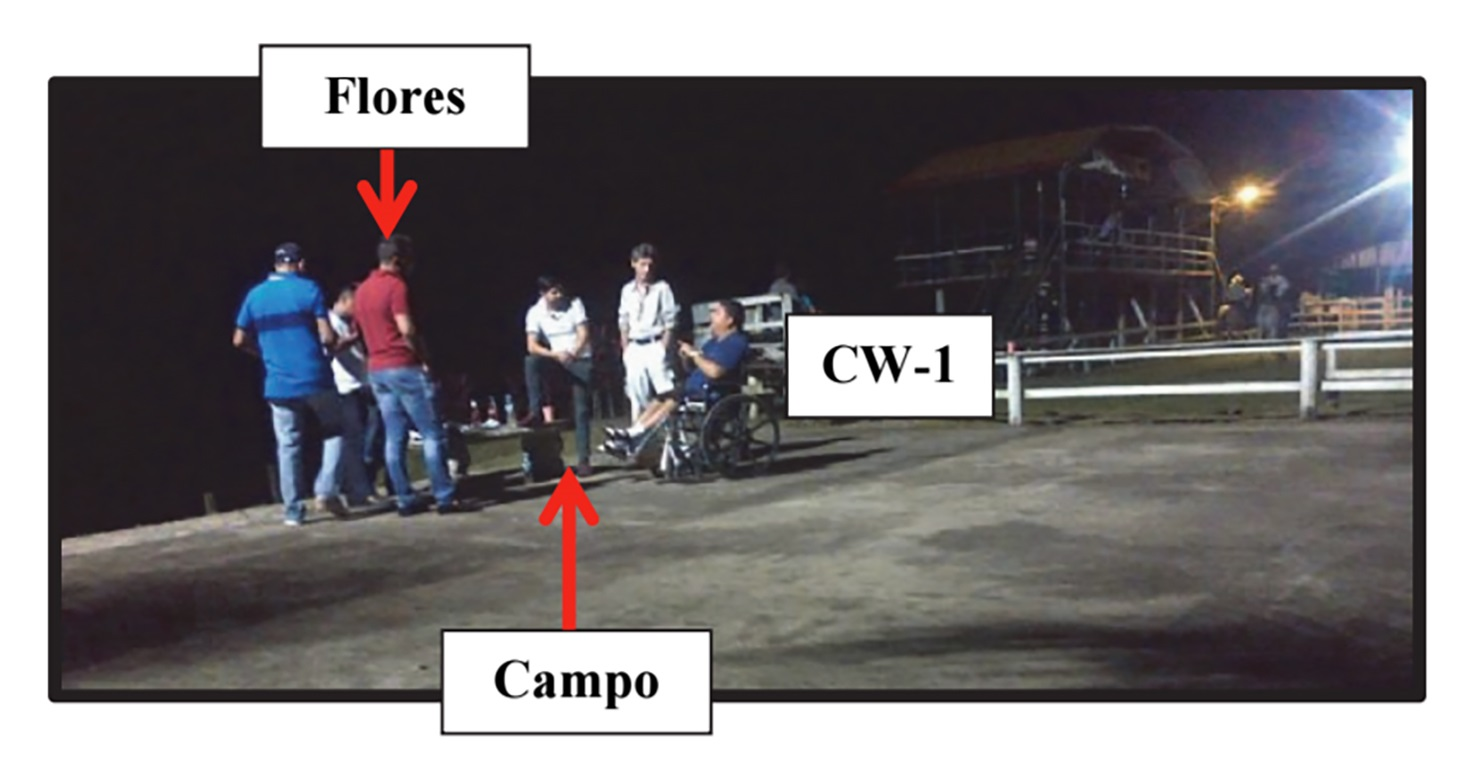
Campo and Flores meeting with CW-1 who used a wheelchair

Two informants that observed the nephews were murdered shortly before and after their arrest, raising concerns that the drug trafficking operation was larger than suspected. Two weeks before the nephews were arrested, the Venezuelan known as "Hamudi" who introduced the nephews to CW-1 was murdered by FARC suppliers. Weeks after the arrests in December 2015, CW-1 was murdered as well.

It is thought to be that the nephews were not "the brains" of the trafficking attempt but were working under the Cartel of the Suns. The murdering of informants was a possible way to cover possible involvement by Venezuelan officials. In the United States, the punishment for killing a witness is a federal offense punishable by up to life in prison or execution.

==== Prisoner exchange ====
In October 2022, Campos and Flores were released and repatriated to Venezuela as part of a settlement agreement with the U.S. government. In exchange, five Venezuelan-American directors of the oil refinery company CITGO—collectively known as the Citgo Six—were released from prison in Venezuela. These directors had been detained on charges related to allegedly signing an agreement deemed "unfavorable" to the Venezuelan subsidiary.

== Media coverage ==
International media focused on the events surrounding the nephews and their trial while Venezuelan media was largely censored from revealing that the two were related to the President Maduro and his wife. Venezuelan media organizations like Globovisión and Últimas Noticias only mentioned that "two Venezuelans" were charged with drug trafficking without showing any relation to the president's family, raising accusations of self-censorship. Social media, which is popular in Venezuela, was used by journalists as a way to allow Venezuelans to bypass censorship and provide updates about the situation surrounding the president's nephews.

== Reactions ==
=== Academics and scholars ===
According to drug trafficking expert, Bruce Bagley of the University of Miami, "The nephews are just the tip of the iceberg ... Corruption is rampant in power circles in Venezuela. This case suggests a culture that drug trafficking is routine and daily fare for someone with contacts in the presidential palace", with Bagley further stating that "With their connections, they felt they would skate through ... They made a mistake because when the DEA heard their names they targeted them."

=== Government of Venezuela ===
After Maduro's nephews were apprehended by the DEA for the illegal distribution of cocaine on 10 November 2015, Maduro posted a statement on Twitter criticizing "attacks and imperialist ambushes" which was viewed by many media outlets as being directed towards the United States. When they were detained, then President Maduro's wife, Cilia Flores, accused the United States of "kidnapping" her nephews and said she had proof they were kidnapped by the DEA. Diosdado Cabello, a senior official in Maduro's government who has been accused of drug trafficking himself, was also quoted as saying the arrests were a "kidnapping" by the United States.

Roberto de Jesús Soto Garcia, a Honduran man who provided assistance to the smugglers, has been linked to Venezuela's Vice President Tareck El Aissami.

Following the arrest of the nephews, Associated Press correspondent Hannah Dreier was detained by SEBIN agents. Dreier said she was interrogated and threatened, and that the agents stated they wanted to exchange Dreier for the arrested nephews.

== See also ==
- Alex Saab
- Citgo Six
- Matthew John Heath
