= Thomas Baer =

Thomas Baer may refer to:

- Thomas M. Baer, American physicist
- Thomas S. Baer (1843–1906), American jurist
