= BAER =

BAER may refer to:

- Burned area emergency response
- Brainstem auditory evoked response
- Baer, surname of German origin
