= United States of America v. Campo and Flores =

Trial of Venezuelan President Maduro's nephews

- Court: United States District Court for the Southern District of New York
- Full case name: United States of America v. Efrain Antonio Campo Flores and Franqui Francisco Flores de Freitas
- Decided: November 18, 2016

Case history
- Prior actions: Sealed indictment, November 4, 2015; Indictment unsealed, November 10, 2015; Arraignment, December 17, 2015; Pretrial hearing, May 12, 2016

Court membership
- Judge sitting: Paul A. Crotty

The United States of America v. Efrain Antonio Campo Flores and Franqui Francisco Flores de Freitas was a court case surrounding two nephews of Venezuelan President Nicolás Maduro, Efraín Antonio Campo Flores and Francisco Flores de Freitas, who were found guilty of attempting to transport 800 kilograms (1,800 lb) of cocaine into the United States.

== Background ==
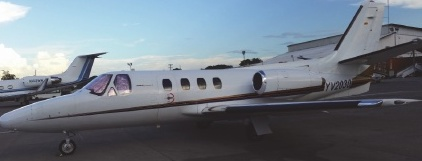
A Cessna Citation 500 used by Campo and Flores

Campo Flores and Flores de Freitas were allegedly involved in illicit activities such as drug trafficking and possibly financially assisted President Maduro's presidential campaign in the 2013 Venezuelan presidential election and potentially for the 2015 Venezuelan parliamentary elections. One informant stated that the two would often fly out of Terminal 4 of Simon Bolivar Airport, a terminal reserved for the president.

The nephews and DEA informants met on multiple occasions in Haiti, Honduras and Venezuela while every meeting "produced an audio recording plus three to seven videos". Campo and Flores planned to ship cocaine supplied by the Revolutionary Armed Forces of Colombia (FARC) to the United States and sought for assistance with their plans.

=== Arrest ===
On 10 November 2015, Campo Flores and Flores de Freites were flown into Port-au-Prince, Haiti by two Venezuelan military personnel accompanied by two presidential honor guards carrying more than 800 kilograms of cocaine destined for New York City. The jet was a Cessna Citation 500 that belonged to Lebanese Venezuelan businessmen Majed and Khaled Khalil Majzoun, who were linked to old projects of the Hugo Chávez government and close to high ranking Venezuelan politician Diosdado Cabello.

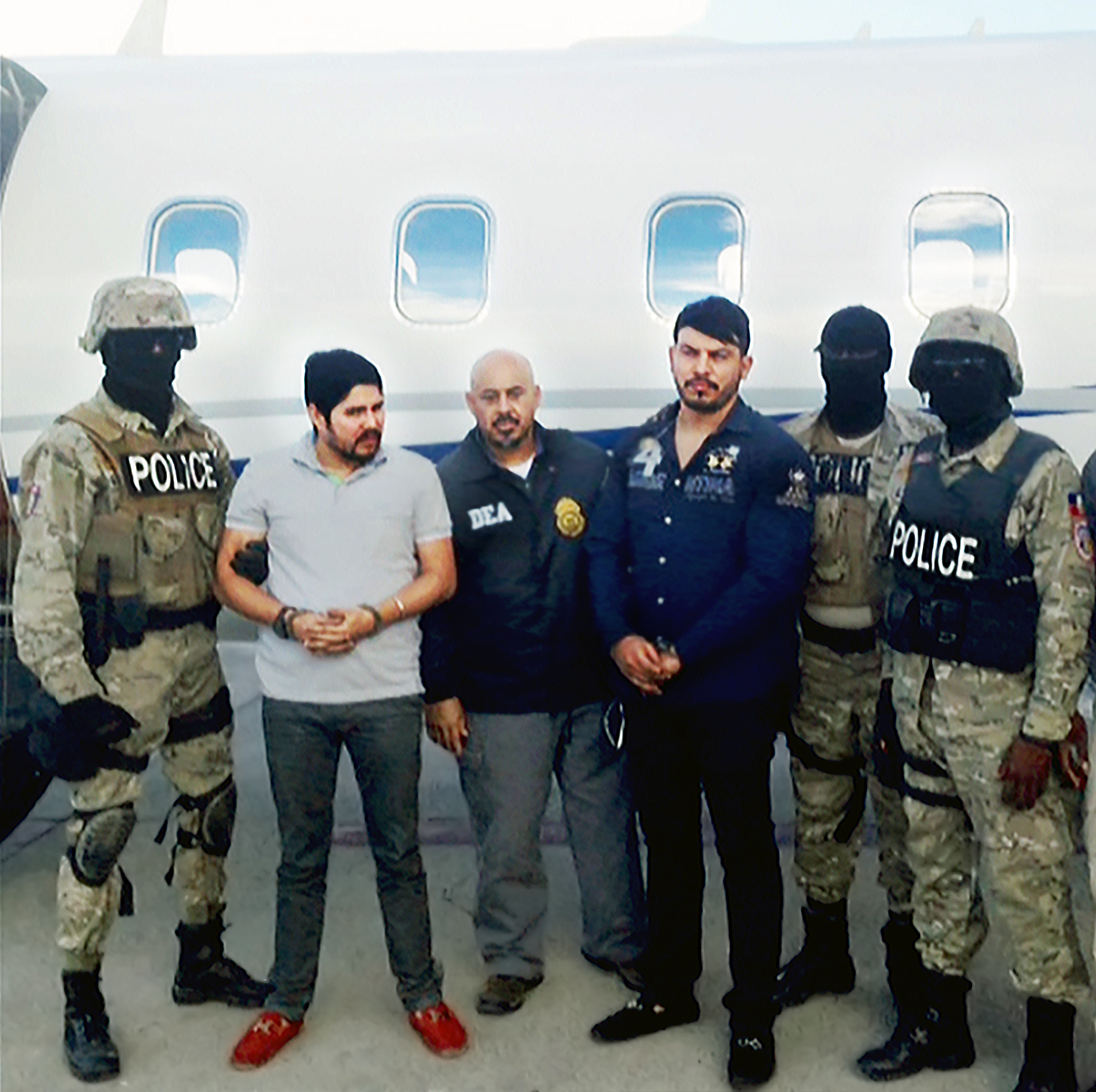
Campo (second from left) and Flores (third from right) following their arrest

CS-1 met with the nephews at a restaurant of a hotel near Toussaint Louverture International Airport and was supposed to pay them $5 million for the cocaine. CS-1 then left into the bathroom and the Haitian Brigade de Lutte contre le Trafic de Stupéfiants (BLTS) and DEA agents raided the restaurant after identifying themselves, apprehending the nephews. The BLTS personnel wore fatigues and vests that read "POLICE" so they would be able to be identified as well. Campos and Flores were later turned over to the DEA and read their Miranda rights after boarding the DEA plane, being flown directly to Westchester County Airport in White Plains, New York in order to face an immediate trial.

The two were interviewed separately on the DEA plane. Campo stated on the DEA plane that he was the adopted step son of President Maduro and that he grew up in the Maduro household while being raised by Flores. He was also shown a picture of a man with a kilo package of cocaine replying "That's me" and when asked what was in the package he said "You know what it is". The two men possessed Venezuelan diplomatic passports but did not have diplomatic immunity according to former head of DEA international operations Michael Vigil. A later raid of Efraín Antonio Campo Flores' "Casa de Campo" mansion and yacht in the Dominican Republic revealed an additional 280 lbs of cocaine and 22 lbs of heroin, with 176 lbs of the drugs found in the home while the remainder was discovered in his yacht.

Due to the extradition process, New York courts could not apprehend those who assisted the nephews on their way to Haiti, though a pilot was later arrested. It was also stated by those close to the case that there are more sealed warrants linked to the incident.

== Charges ==
=== By code violation ===
The charges were:

- "§952(a) Importation of controlled substances—Controlled substances in schedule I or II and narcotic drugs in schedule III, IV, or V". 21 U.S.C.
- "§959(a) Possession, manufacture, or distribution of controlled substance—Manufacture or distribution for purpose of unlawful importation". 21 U.S.C.
- "§960(a)(1) (Prohibited acts—knowingly or intentionally imports or exports a controlled substance)". 21 U.S.C.
- "§960(a)(3) (Prohibited acts—manufactures, possesses with intent to distribute, or distributes a controlled substance)". 21 U.S.C.
- "§960(b)(1)(B)(ii)". 21 U.S.C. "Prohibited acts—In the case of a violation of subsection (a) of this section involving—cocaine, its salts, optical and geometric isomers, and salts or isomers"

== Pre-trial actions ==
United States Attorney Preet Bharara is handling the case for the United States District Court for the Southern District of New York.

The law firm Squire Patton Boggs provided defense for the two nephews, with Campo's attorneys being John J. Reily, Rebekah J. Poston and Alfredo Angola while Flores' were Vincent M. Sutherland and Jonathan A. Marvinny. Campo's was also represented by other from multiple firms which consisted of another three attorneys; Randall Wade Jackson, Kafahni Nkrumah and John Thomas Zach.

The nephews originally plead not guilty to the charges of conspiring to transport cocaine into the United States, with the two facing up to life in prison.

=== May 12 — Pre-trial hearing ===
On May 12, 2016, Judge Paul A. Crotty set the trial date for November 7, 2016. The defense also acknowledged that Campo and Flores were having their attorneys paid for by an unknown third party, which Judge Crotty noted was a "conflict of interest".

=== July 1 — Defense arguments ===
In trial papers filed on 1 July 2016, the nephews stated that they were not informed of their rights when detained, attempting to suppress their statements that they made to DEA agents after their arrest. Campo also argued that while attending a "meeting" on the day of their arrest, their room was stormed by men without "any insignias on their uniforms" and that he feared that due to their "familial relationship with senior members of the Venezuelan government", he thought that they "were potential targets for an extortionate scheme or other violent attempt at retribution against [their] family and country". Campo stated that while being transited to New York, he was questioned before being handed a Miranda form, though he also answered questions after signing the form as well.

The defense also requested that the confidential informants used by the DEA should be revealed, basing their argument on the Brady v. Maryland Supreme Court case.

=== July 22 — Prosecution evidence ===
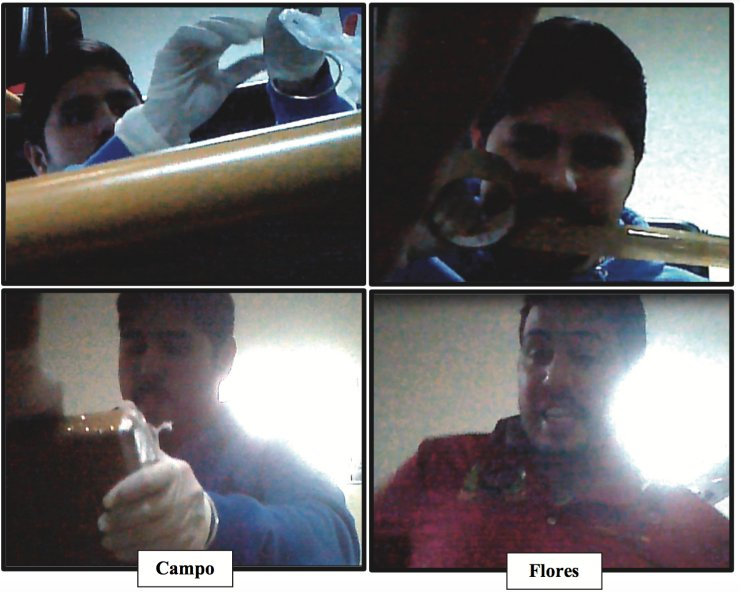
Campo and Flores seen showing the purity of drugs in a secret video during a 27 October 2015 meeting in Caracas, Venezuela with DEA informants

On July 22, 2016, statements made by the two directed to DEA agents were filed as an exhibit by the United States Attorney Office in Manhattan, with the two men confessing to their conspiracy to traffic cocaine into the United States that was supposed to be supplied by the Colombian guerilla group, the Revolutionary Armed Forces of Colombia (FARC). The pair hoped to make $20 million through multiple drug shipments.

=== October 12 ===
Judge Paul A. Crotty made a statement on October 12 that the nephews had been informed of their rights, stating that there was "no credible evidence that the DEA agents used mental or physical coercion in eliciting defendants' waiver or statements" and that Campo stated to agents that he was an attorney himself. Because of this, Judge Crotty ruled that confessions made by the nephews could not be thrown out like the defense wanted since the two knew what they were doing, and that all recordings created of the nephews were also eligible to be used in court.

==== Informant transcripts ====
Following the ruling, the transcripts of the conversation between Campo and an informant were released, with Campo stating:

We need the money ... Why? Because the Americans are hitting us hard with money. Do you understand? The opposition ... is getting an infusion of a lot of money. ... we're at war [with the United States].

Campo also said that the cash was for his "mother", Cilia Flores, so it could be used for her campaign for the 2015 Venezuelan parliamentary elections. He joked about jailing opposition politicians as well, saying that "We put them in jail over here ... We send them to jail for 15 years".

== Trial ==
On November 7, 2016, trial for the nephews was initiated, with a jury of 16 people, 10 men and 6 women, with 4 of the present listed as alternates. Drug Enforcement Administration Special Agent Sandal Gonzalez and a Haitian Brigade de Lutte contre le Trafic de Stupéfiants Agent, as well as the two arrested informants, were used as witnesses during the trial.

=== November 7 ===
The trial began with United States prosecutor Emil Bove provided an opening statement. Bove explained how the nephews "believed they were so powerful in their country they could ship almost a metric ton of cocaine from one airport to another" and asked Special Agent Gonzalez about "cryptic text messages between one of the DEA confidential sources and a man who used the initials of former President Hugo Chavez", with the messages referring to an "architect".

The defense began their argument with Campo's defense attorney John Zach stating, "To put it bluntly, it comes down to a handful of stupid, stupid decisions by my client and his cousin", continuing "how utterly clueless Efrain is – it's almost embarrassing". They argued that the informants were not to be trusted due to the illicit activities they performed while working for the DEA. Zach described his client as "stupid" multiple times, implying that only a legitimate drug trafficker would know that they were walking into a DEA operation the way they had.

US attorney Bove concluded saying that the jurors did not have to be fond of the arrested informants but to instead focus on the evidence, stating that the nephews "were caught red-handed".

=== November 8 ===
The defense argued that the two nephews were going to rob the informants of the $20 million since no drugs were recovered from the nephews. Randall Jackson, an attorney for one of the nephews, questioned special agent Gonzalez about the $20 million offered as an advance by the informants, with the agent admitting he had never heard of a similar actions by supposed drug traffickers before. Gonzalez did state, however, that "the men were arrested for conspiracy beforehand because they were requesting payment in advance, which the DEA was not going to provide", stating that recordings provided by the informants had provided sufficient information and that Campo was willing to work with prosecutors to investigate money laundering allegations.

=== November 9 ===
Prosecutors attempted to dismiss the argument that Campo and Flores were inexperienced. Recordings of Campo were presented with his demeanor described as being "business-like", as if he had experience. An image of Hugo Chávez was also used in the presentation, with both Campo and Flores protesting against the usage of his image.

=== November 10 ===
More audio and visual recordings of the nephews were presented in trial. In the recordings, Campo is seen telling the DEA informants that he had previously done drug business with a French trafficker and compared the costs of business in Europe and Central America. He also stated, "I am 30 years old. I've done this since I was 18". The arrested informant who was drug trafficking while working for the DEA, Jose Santos Peña, explained how he had recorded the nephews. In a video presented "members of the jury could hear Campo snapping on latex gloves, which, Santos said, the defendant put on before handling a white powder he said was cocaine".

At the conclusion of the day, the trial was put in recess until Monday, November 14.

=== November 14 ===
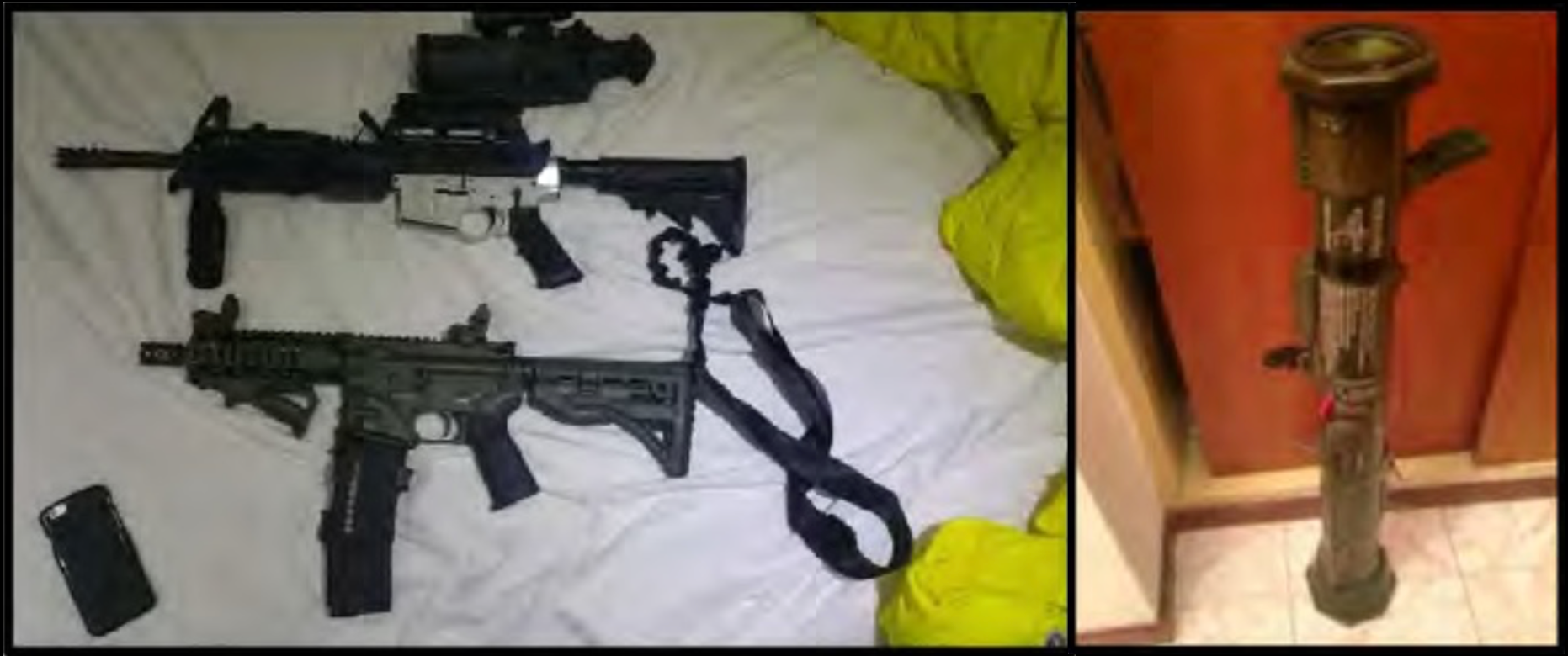
Photos from Campo's phone showing two firearms and an AT4 rocket launcher

Images of alleged weapons that were saved on the phones of the nephews were presented by prosecutors in court, with the defense's response suggesting that the images were only showing "toys" that Campo and Flores played with.

The defense representing Campo and Flores stated that the controversial informant, Jose Santos Peña, was attempting to distribute drugs while he was in prison, stating that they had recordings of him attempting to do so. The prosecution asked for more time to review the recordings while Judge Crotty allowed the defense to use this argument, stating that it would show the credibility of the informant. Attorneys for Campos and Flores also pressured Santos on his opinion of how experienced the nephews were at drug trafficking, though Santos would only say "that they were less experienced than him".

=== November 15 ===
After the defense revealed that the controversial informant, Jose Santos Peña, and his son were allegedly making controversial calls while in jail, prosecutors threatened to end a deal with the informants, with Assistant U.S. Attorney Brendan Quigley stating "you now understand your cooperation agreement is getting ripped up".

=== November 16 ===
In a recording presented by the US Attorney's Office, Flores can be heard saying that he controlled the presidential hangar in Maiquetia International Airport, stating "I have control and I can take off in the plane whenever I want". An arrested air traffic control operator, Carlos Gonzalez, was used as a witness stating that he came up with the logistics on how to transport the drugs supplied by the nephews to Mexico and the United States after they were received at Juan Manuel Gálvez International Airport. After being flown to the airport, drugs would be shipped on speed boats to Mexico and the United States for sale. In another recording, Flores says that he believes that Venezuelan official Diosdado Cabello is in charge of the armed forces, though he does not know if Cabello is high ranking in the Cartel of the Suns.

Judge Crotty also presented a list to jurors of those associated with or participated in the operation, which included:

- Roberto de Jesús Soto García
- Cilia Flores
- Pablo Rafael Urbano Pérez
- Pedro Miguel Rodríguez González
- Marco Tulio Uzcategui Contreras
- Jesfran Josnel Moreno Sojo
- César Orlando Daza Cardona
- Ruben Walls C
- Ruben Lugo
- Mohhamed Abulzazza
- Mohamad Khalil

=== November 17 ===
In the closing arguments of the trial, Assistant U.S. Attorney Brendan Quigley asked the jurors to focus on the evidence presented rather than the controversial informant, while the defense stated that the informant "infects every aspect" of Flores and Campo's trial. Quigley told the jury that the evidence presented in text messages and other recordings shows that Flores and Campo were "eager and enthusiastic to do drug deals" and that "The evidence in Venezuela comes not from Santos-Pena's mouth".

=== November 18 — Verdict ===
On November 18, 2016 after six hours of deliberations, the jury of seven women and five men found Campo and Flores guilty of attempting to "carry out a multimillion-dollar drug deal to obtain a large amount of cash to help their family stay in power". One member of the jury stated that "nobody was in love with the witnesses", but that the jurors instead focused on the evidence presented to them to make their decision.

== Controversy ==
=== Informants ===
==== Murdered informants ====
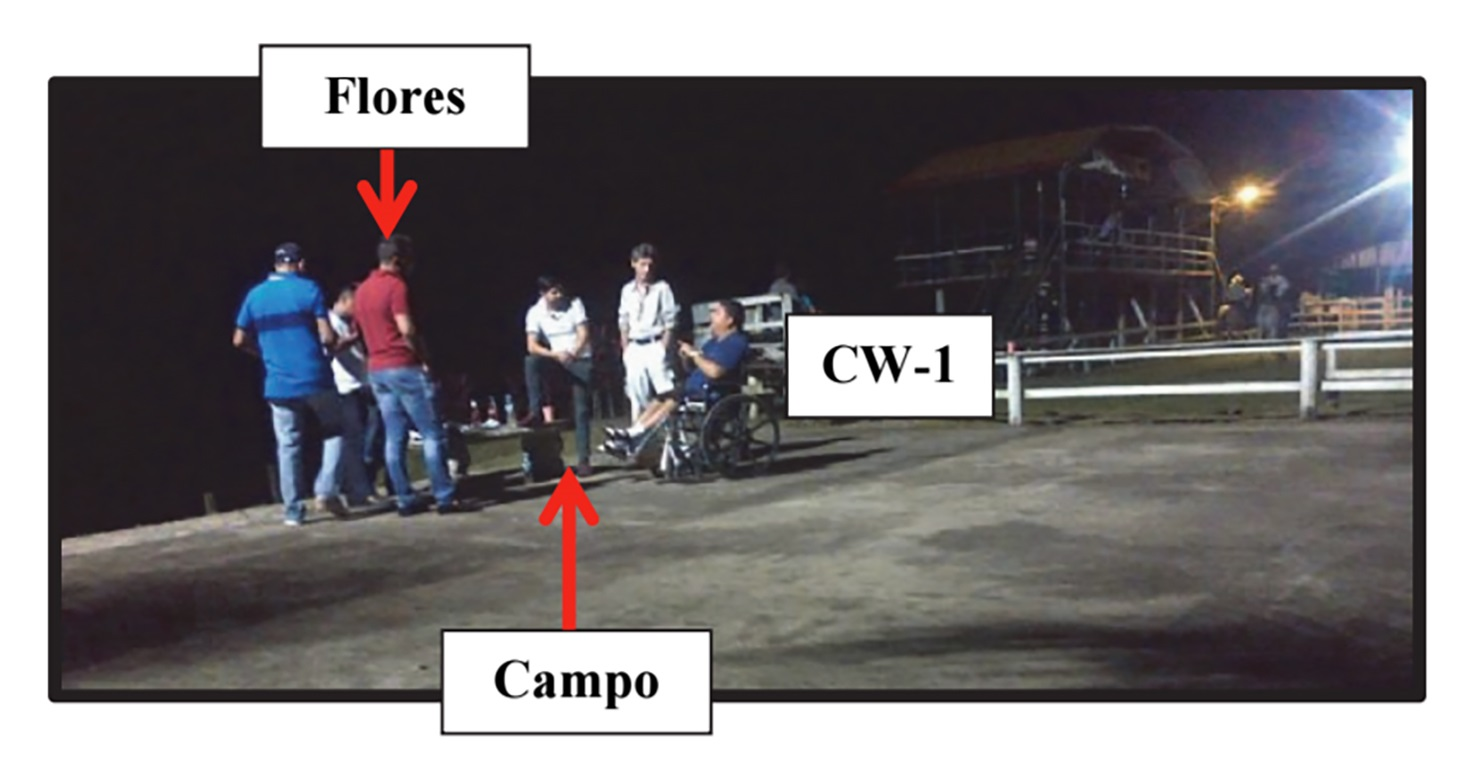
Campo and Flores meeting with CW-1 (at right in wheelchair), who was murdered weeks later

Two informants who allegedly observed the nephews were murdered shortly before and after their arrest, raising concerns that the drug trafficking operation was larger than suspected. Two weeks before the nephews were arrested, the Venezuelan known as "Hamudi" who introduced the nephews to CW-1 was murdered by FARC suppliers. Weeks after the arrests in December 2015, CW-1 was murdered as well.

It is thought to be that the nephews were not "the brains" of the trafficking attempt but were working under the Cartel of the Suns. The murdering of witnesses was a possible way to cover possible involvement by Venezuelan officials. In the United States, the punishment for killing a witness is a federal offense punishable by up to life in prison or execution.

==== Arrested informants ====
Two informants, a father and son, were arrested for selling drugs while working for the DEA after being paid $1.2 million by the United States. The defense argued to the jury that the informants were untrustworthy while prosecutors stated that jurors did not have to like the informants and instead use common sense and the evidence provided to make their decision.

Despite this, Judge Paul Crotty ruled on 15 June 2018 not to release the identities of the informants to maintain the security of them and their families, with transcripts surrounding the informants being indefinitely sealed.

=== Funding of attorneys ===
Months after a potential conflict of interest was addressed in the May pre-trial hearing due to an unknown individual paying for the nephews legal fees, it was revealed that Wilmer Ruperti, a Venezuelan businessman who has close relations to the Bolivarian Government of Venezuela, was the one who was involved. Ruperti had helped circumvent the Venezuelan general strike of 2002–2003 and was given the Star of Carabobo by Maduro's predecessor, President Hugo Chávez for his actions. He had recently received a "$138 million contract to dispose of tons of petroleum coke" and described his support for the presidential family stating "This perturbs the tranquility of the presidential family. You need the president to be calm ... I am helping to preserve the constitutional government".

== See also ==
- Crime in Venezuela
- Corruption in Venezuela
- United States v. Maduro et al.
