= John Baer =

John Baer may refer to:

- John Baer (journalist) (1946/1947–2026), American journalist at the Philadelphia Daily News
- John Metz Baer, American professor of educational psychology
- John Miller Baer (1886–1970), American congressman from North Dakota
- John Willis Baer (1861–1931), American Presbyterian leader and college president
- John Baer (actor) (1923–2006), American actor in Terry and the Pirates and other works

== See also ==
- John Bear (disambiguation)
