= Lewis J. Liman =

American federal judge (born 1960)

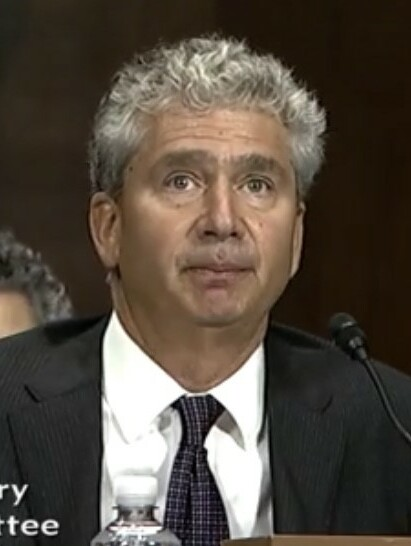

Judge of the United States District Court for the Southern District of New York
- Incumbent
- Assumed office December 31, 2019
- Appointed by: Donald Trump
- Preceded by: Paul A. Crotty

Personal details
- Born: 1960 (age 65–66) New York City, New York, U.S.
- Spouse: Lisa Cohen (m. 1999)
- Parent: Arthur L. Liman (father)
- Relatives: Doug Liman (brother)
- Education: Harvard University (BA); London School of Economics (MSc); Yale University (JD)

Lewis Jeffrey Liman (born in 1960) is an American lawyer and jurist serving as a United States district judge of the United States District Court for the Southern District of New York.

== Education ==
Liman was born in 1960 in New York City. He graduated from the Ethical Culture Fieldston School in 1979. He graduated from Harvard University in 1983 with a Bachelor of Arts, magna cum laude. He then spent a year at the London School of Economics, receiving a Master of Science in economics with distinction. Liman then attended Yale Law School, where he served as an articles editor of the Yale Law Journal and as an editor of the Yale Journal of International Law and graduated in 1987 with a Juris Doctor.

== Career ==
Upon graduation from law school he spent a brief period as an attorney at the NAACP Legal Defense and Educational Fund. He was a law clerk to Judge Pierre N. Leval of the Southern District of New York from 1987 to 1988 before Leval was elevated to the United States Court of Appeals for the Second Circuit. He then clerked for Justice John Paul Stevens of the Supreme Court of the United States from 1989 to 1990.

After his Supreme Court clerkship, Liman entered private practice at Cravath, Swaine & Moore. In 1994, Liman became an Assistant United States Attorney for the Southern District of New York, where he rose to serve as Deputy Chief of Appeals. From 1999 to 2003, Liman was a partner at Wilmer Cutler Pickering Hale and Dorr. From 2003 to 2019, he was a partner in the New York City office of Cleary Gottlieb Steen & Hamilton, where he handled a wide range of civil, commercial, and white collar criminal litigation.

=== Federal judicial service ===
In August 2017, Liman was one of several candidates pitched to New York Senators Chuck Schumer and Kirsten Gillibrand by the White House for vacancies on the federal courts in New York. On May 10, 2018, President Donald Trump announced his intent to nominate Liman to serve as a United States district judge for the United States District Court for the Southern District of New York as part of a bipartisan package of judicial nominees which included Mary Kay Vyskocil, Rachel Kovner, John Sinatra, and Eric R. Komitee. On May 15, 2018, his nomination was sent to the United States Senate. He was nominated to the seat that was vacated by Judge Paul A. Crotty, who assumed senior status on August 1, 2015. On August 1, 2018, a hearing on his nomination was held before the Senate Judiciary Committee. On September 13, 2018, his nomination was reported out of committee by a 17–4 vote.

On January 3, 2019, his nomination was returned to the President under Rule XXXI, Paragraph 6 of the United States Senate. On April 8, 2019, President Trump announced the renomination of Liman to the district court. On May 21, 2019, his nomination was sent to the Senate. On June 20, 2019, his nomination was reported out of committee by a 15–7 vote. On December 19, 2019, the Senate confirmed his nomination by a 64–29 vote. He received his judicial commission on December 31, 2019.

== Personal life ==
Liman married his wife Lisa (née Cohen) in 1999. An alumnus of Barnard College, she was previously the institution's director of alumnae programs.

== See also ==
- List of Jewish American jurists
- List of law clerks for the fourth seat of the Supreme Court of the United States

Legal offices
Preceded by Paul A. Crotty	Judge of the United States District Court for the Southern District of New York; 2019–present	Incumbent
