= Arthur L. Liman =

American lawyer

Arthur Lawrence Liman (November 5, 1932 – July 17, 1997) was an American lawyer and partner at the New York firm of Paul, Weiss, Rifkind, Wharton & Garrison. Liman served as the chief counsel for both the New York state commission for the Attica Prison riot in 1971 and the investigation of the Iran–Contra affair in 1987.

== Early life and education ==
Arthur Liman was born on November 5, 1932, in Far Rockaway, Queens, and spent most of his childhood in Lawrence, Long Island. Liman's grandparents were Jewish immigrants from Russia, who settled in New York City. Liman's mother was valedictorian of her high school class, Phi Beta Kappa at Hunter College, and taught Latin. His father graduated from City College of New York and taught history in public schools before joining his father's dressmaking business. Liman's older sister Gladys, a graduate of Smith College, was a poet.

Liman attended Harvard University, where he studied political science and graduated in 1954. Liman wrote in his memoir that he decided to become a lawyer after observing a day of hearings by the Senate Permanent Subcommittee on Investigations of the Committee on Government Operations, known colloquially as the "McCarthy Hearings." Liman decided to attend the hearings because he had chosen to write his senior thesis on "the threat that McCarthy-style congressional investigations posed to our concepts of civil liberties and limited government." Liman recalled that "[b]y the time the spectacle ended, I was shaken to the core."

Liman pursued his law degree from Yale Law School, and graduated in 1957. He wrote that, due to Yale's teaching of legal realism, it "was the ideal place for a young man wary of orthodoxy." Against the backdrop of the civil rights movement and Brown v. Board of Education, "Yale taught me, above all, that lawyers could make a difference in the type of society that we had."

== Career ==
Upon graduation, Liman joined the New York City law firm of Paul, Weiss, Rifkind, Wharton & Garrison, where he became a partner and where he worked for most of his career. Liman quickly became a trial lawyer, and "I never looked back." Liman's practice focused on commercial litigation and corporate criminal defense. Clients included Wall Street magnate Michael Milken and media conglomerate Time Warner.

Throughout, Liman devoted large portions of his time to public service. He served as an Assistant United States attorney under Robert Morgenthau from 1961 to 1963. There, he focused on securities fraud and also took on drug prosecutions in order to gain trial experience. Liman's experience as a prosecutor—and especially his exposure to the mandatory minimum sentences faced by the defendants he prosecuted—later informed his support for criminal justice reform.

In 1971, Liman became involved at the center of a national controversy regarding Attica Correctional Facility, a maximum security prison in Attica, New York. On September 9, 1971, a series of small scuffles between prisoners and staff escalated into large-scale violence, as a group of prisoners passed through a broken gate and took control of parts of the facility (Attica Prison riot). Within several hours, 1,281 prisoners had gathered in the recreation yard, along with 42 staff members, held as hostages. A leadership group of about fifty prisoners emerged to state the prisoners' demands, which reflected long-standing disputes with the administration and focused on improving the quality of basic necessitates, increasing opportunities for rehabilitation, and curtailing the use of segregation and other punitive measures. Negotiations—conducted through intermediaries chosen by the prisoners—broke down when the Governor Rockefeller refused to grant amnesty to all prisoners involved in the rebellion. On September 13, Governor Rockefeller ordered in the State Police to take back the prison, and 39 people – 29 prisoners and 9 hostages – were killed in the span of minutes. One more hostage eventually died of gunshot wounds.

At Governor Rockefeller's request, Liman was appointed to serve as chief counsel of the New York State Special Commission on the Attica Prison uprising (the McKay Commission). Liman led the investigation, "the main purpose of which is to dispel the long-persisting doubts about what actually happened." He and his staff spent months documenting events and speaking to all parties involved. Liman took special care to develop trust with the prisoners and later described joining 500 prisoners for their supper on Christmas Day in 1971.

The commission's final report was published as a paperback in 1972 and was nominated for a National Book Award. The report observed that "[s]ave for the Wounded Knee massacre, the assault at Attica was the bloodiest one-day encounter between Americans since the Civil War." It examined "state rules and procedures, prison politics, the changing nature of the inmate population, and festering racism – a volatile mix," and recommended a broad set of reforms to prosecutorial, sentencing, and correctional practices because "Attica is every prison; and every prison is Attica." The report concluded "[t]he only way to salvage meaning out of the otherwise senseless killings at Attica is to learn from this experience that our Atticas are failures. The crucial issues remain unresolved; and the will continue unresolved until an aroused public demands something better."

=== Iran-Contra Affair ===
Liman was the chief counsel for the Senate's investigation of the Iran–Contra affair, known as the United States Senate Select Committee on Secret Military Assistance to Iran and the Nicaraguan Opposition. The Washington Post described the incident as:

The Iran-Contra scandal burst upon the scene in November 1986 when it was first reported in a Lebanese newspaper that President Ronald Reagan had approved the sale of missiles to Iran in exchange for American hostages in Lebanon. Later, Justice Department lawyers found evidence that proceeds from the arms sales had been diverted to illegally fund the contra anticommunist guerrillas in Nicaragua in circumvention of the Boland Amendment banning U.S. aid to the rebels. It was an audacious, covert scheme -- known by its participants as "the Enterprise" -- carried out largely by a small group of top administration officials and private operators without the knowledge of Congress. And when it began to unravel, the foremost question congressional investigators faced was the classic one echoing from the days of Watergate: What did the president know and when did he know it?

Liman led the investigation and conducted 40 days of televised hearings before the Senate. Two key witnesses – Lt. Col. Oliver North and Vice Adm. John Poindexter – refused to state that President Reagan had played any role in the covert actions. In his later memoirs, Liman reflected that "the public and the media tended to believe that Congress somehow had ‘lost' and the witnesses ‘won'. . . . But Iran-contra wasn't about winning and losing. An attempt had been made to undermine our Constitution. What the investigation accomplished was to bring all of it, in all its details, to the national attention. In this sense, I believe we all won."

== Philanthropic work ==
Liman was also central in founding and running a number of organizations dedicated to increasing access to justice for poor people and to improving criminal justice. He served as President of the Legal Aid Society of New York and of the Neighborhood Defender Services of Harlem; Chair of the Legal Action Center in New York City; Trustee of the Vera Institute of Justice; and Chair of the New York State Capital Defender's Office. Upon Liman's death in 1997, the President of the Vera Institute wrote that Liman's "service to these organizations was unquantifiable." Liman reflected in his memoir that "[p]ublic service is a lawyer's privilege, one of the rewards of the profession. It is not an act of duty or charity. For a lawyer, public service is as natural as breathing. It is what we do when we're at our best."

== Personal life ==
Arthur Liman died on July 17, 1997, in New York City. He was survived by his wife, née Ellen Fogelson, a writer and painter, and their three children, and his sister. The children are Emily R. Liman, a professor of neuroscience at the University of Southern California, Doug Liman, a film director, and Lewis J. Liman, a United States District Judge of the United States District Court for the Southern District of New York.

Yale Law School created the Arthur Liman Public Interest Fellowship and Fund in 1997. The program offers fellowships for Yale Law School graduates to spend a year working on issues such as welfare rights, elder law, indigent criminal defense, immigration, and juvenile justice. The program also awards summer fellowships to students at Barnard, Brown, Harvard, Princeton, Spelman, and Yale to pursue public interest-themed projects at organizations across the country. As of 2013, they had awarded fellowships to 94 Yale Law School graduates, and well as to hundreds of undergraduates.

== Published works ==
Liman's memoir, Lawyer: A Life of Counsel and Controversy, was published posthumously in 1998 and released in paperback in 2003.
