= Bär =

Bär (or Baer, meaning "bear" in German) is a surname of several possible origins: German, Dutch, or Jewish. It may be derived from the nickname "bear" or from some given name.

== Surnames ==
- Dietmar Bär (born 1961), German actor
- Dorothee Bär (born 1978), German politician
- Heinrich Bär (1913–1957), German Luftwaffe fighter ace in World War II
- Karl Bär (born 1985), German politician
- Olaf Bär (born 1957), German operatic baritone
- Philippe Bär (1928–2025), Dutch Roman Catholic bishop

== Nicknames ==
- Bär McKinnon (born 1969), American musician
