= Yitzhak Baer =

German-Israeli historian (1888–1980)

- יצחק בער
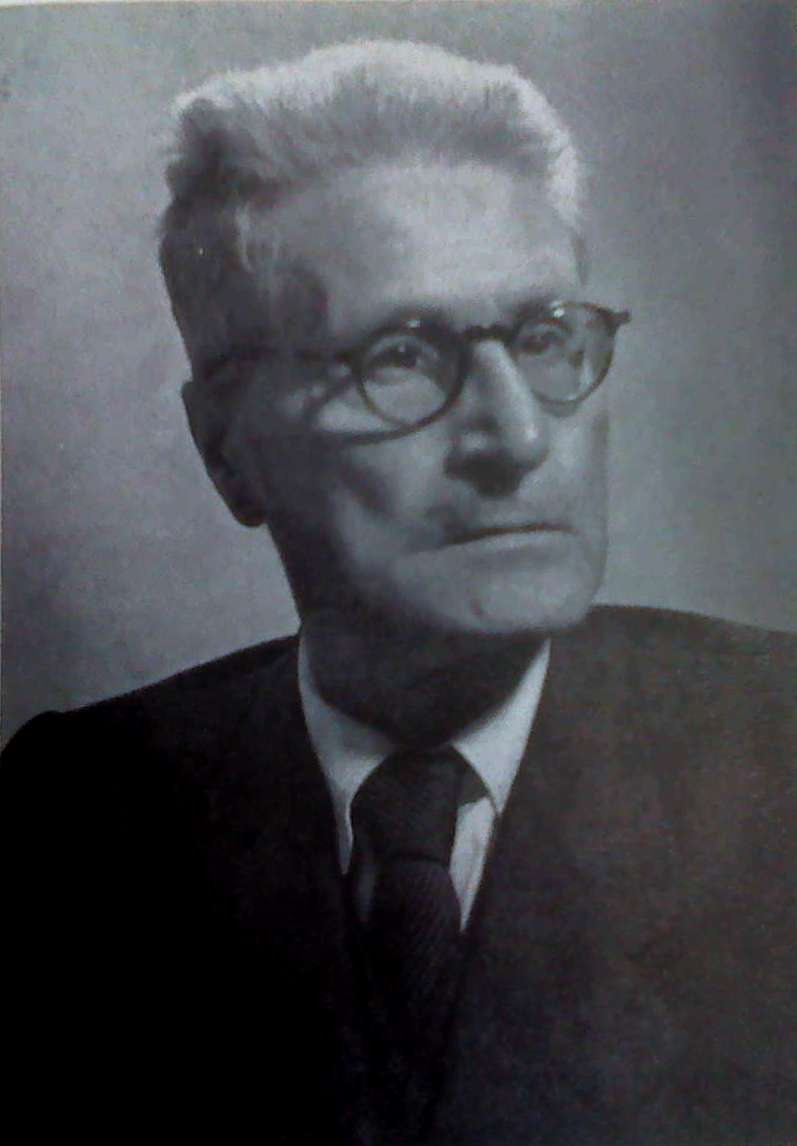
- Born: Fritz Baer; 20 December 1888; Halberstadt, Saxony, Germany
- Died: 22 January 1980 (aged 91); Jerusalem, Israel
- Occupation: Historian
- Known for: Bialik Prize; Israel Prize; Yakir Yerushalayim

Yitzhak (Fritz) Baer (Also known as Fritz Bär, Hebrew: יצחק בער; 20 December 1888 – 22 January 1980) was a German-Israeli historian and an expert on medieval Spanish Jewish history.

== Early life ==
Baer was born in Halberstadt in the Prussian Province of Saxony, Germany, in 1888. He studied philosophy, history and classical philology at Berlin University, the University of Strasbourg and the University of Freiburg.

He emigrated to Mandatory Palestine, now Israel, in 1930, and began lecturing on medieval Jewish history at the Hebrew University of Jerusalem. He was professor of medieval history at the University from 1932 to 1945.

== Awards ==
- In 1945, Baer was awarded the Bialik Prize for Jewish thought.
- In 1958, he was awarded the Israel Prize, in Jewish studies.
- In 1968, he received the Yakir Yerushalayim (Worthy Citizen of Jerusalem) award.

== Bibliography ==
- Studien zur Geschichte der Juden im Konigreich Aragonien während des 13. und 14. Jahrhunderts. Berlin: E. Ebering, 1913
- Das Protokollbuch der Landjudenschaft des Herzogtums Kleve. Erster Teil: Die Geschichte des Landjudenschaft Herzogtums Kleve. Berlin: C.A. Schwetschke, 1922
- Untersuchungen über Quellen und Komposition des Schebet Jehuda. Berlin: C.A. Schwetschke, 1923
- Galut'/ Jizchak Fritz Baer. Berlin: Shocken, 1936
- Land of Israel and Exile to the Medieval Ages. Jerusalem, 1936.
- History of Jews in Christian Spain. Tel Aviv: Am Oved 1945, revised and expanded 1959.
- Peoples of Israel: Studies in the History of the Second Temple Period of the Mishna, the Foundations of Law and Faith. Jerusalem: Bialik Institute, 1955.
- Exile (translated from German): Israel Eldad, Bialik Institute, Jerusalem, 1980.
- Studies and Essays in the History of Israel (in Hebrew), 1985. Jerusalem: Israeli Historical Society, 1985.

== See also ==
- Baer
- List of Bialik Prize recipients
- List of Israel Prize recipients
