= John Bear =

John Bear may refer to:

- John Bear (educator), American author and educator
- John Bear (snooker player) (1944–2007), Canadian snooker player
- John C. Bear (born 1972), Pennsylvania politician
- John Bear (pirate), pirate active in the Caribbean 1684–1689
- John Bear (politician), member of the Wyoming House of Representatives

== See also ==
- John Beare (1820–1914), Canadian farmer and mill owner
- John Baer (disambiguation)
- John Drew-Bear (born 1955), Venezuelan sailor
