= Paul A. Crotty =

American judge (born 1941)

Senior Judge of the United States District Court for the Southern District of New York
- Incumbent
- Assumed office August 1, 2015

Judge of the United States District Court for the Southern District of New York
- In office April 13, 2005 – August 1, 2015
- Appointed by: George W. Bush
- Preceded by: Harold Baer Jr.
- Succeeded by: Lewis J. Liman

75th Corporation Counsel of New York City
- In office January 1, 1994 – November 6, 1997
- Mayor: Rudy Giuliani
- Preceded by: O. Peter Sherwood
- Succeeded by: Michael D. Hess

Personal details
- Born: Paul Austin Crotty; April 1, 1941 (age 85) Buffalo, New York, U.S.
- Parent(s): Margaret and Peter Crotty
- Education: University of Notre Dame (BA); Cornell University (LLB)

Paul Austin Crotty (born April 1, 1941) is a senior United States district judge of the United States District Court for the Southern District of New York. Early in his career, he worked as a lawyer at Donovan, Leisure, Newton & Irvine, and in the 1980s, he was Commissioner of New York City's Office of Financial Services, as well as Finance Commissioner and commissioner for Housing Preservation & Development. He was nominated by President George W. Bush to a seat on the United States District Court for the Southern District of New York in 2005.

== Early life and education ==
Paul A. Crotty was born in Buffalo, New York in 1941 to Margaret and Peter Crotty. His father, Peter J. Crotty, was the son of an immigrant longshoreman. Peter Crotty was a lawyer and a politician. The family consisted of six brothers and a daughter; all six of the family's sons became lawyers, including Paul.

Crotty received a Bachelor of Arts degree from the University of Notre Dame in 1962 and a Bachelor of Laws from Cornell Law School in 1967.

He was also in the United States Navy Reserve from 1962 to 1968.

== Career ==
He was a law clerk to Judge Lloyd Francis MacMahon of the United States District Court for the Southern District of New York, from 1967 to 1969.

Crotty entered private practice in New York City at the prominent law firm of Donovan, Leisure, Newton & Irvine, working there as an associate from 1969 to 1976, and then as a partner from 1976 to 1984, and from 1988 to 1993.

In 1973, he lost a Democratic primary for City Council in on the Lower East Side of Manhattan.

In February 1984, he was appointed Commissioner of the city's Office of Financial Services, and later that year became Finance Commissioner. From 1984 to 1988, he held several government positions in the Office of Financial Services for the City of New York. He was a commissioner in that office in 1984, and then Commissioner of Finance from 1984 to 1986, and a commissioner for Housing Preservation & Development until 1988.

After having returned to private practice for a time, he became the Corporation Counsel from 1994 to 1997, and group president for the New York and Connecticut region for Verizon Communications from 1997 to 2005.

=== Federal judicial service ===
On February 14, 2005, Crotty was nominated by President George W. Bush to a seat on the United States District Court for the Southern District of New York vacated by Harold Baer Jr. Crotty was confirmed by the United States Senate on April 11, 2005, and received his commission on April 15, 2005. He assumed senior status on August 1, 2015.

==== Notable rulings ====
In April 2014, he ruled on a federal case involving caps on contributions to independent political-action committees in New York. In the case, he ruled the state's $150,000 limit on individual donations to the "super PACs" could be held in light of the 2010 Citizens United ruling.

In 2018, in response to a 2017 immigration change by the Trump administration, he ruled that "the government acted unlawfully by requiring unaccompanied immigrant children to remain detained until an agency's director personally approved their release, a process that delayed their freedom and caused suffering." He also granted class-action status to the legal action that civil rights lawyers for the New York Civil Liberties Union had filed on behalf of one child. According to the NYCLU, about 700 children had been subject to the policy that Crotty struck down, with some detained for over a year.

Also in 2018, he ruled against the detainment by ICE of a pizza delivery man, who had been arrested while delivering food to a Brooklyn army base. He granted a stay of deportation while the man pursued permanent residency.

In 2020, he presided on Melendez v. Sirius XM Radio Inc, a lawsuit by John Melendez of the Howard Stern show against SiriusXM, dismissing it in June 2021.

After overseeing the original trial, in 2020, he oversaw the retrial of a former CIA software engineer, Joshua Schulte, accused of leaking secrets through WikiLeaks, in an espionage case. In 2020, he allowed the defendant to represent himself.

In 2022, he was the judge in a case challenging New York Mayor Eric Adams' plan to take mentally ill homeless people to hospitals against their will.

In May 2022, as Senior U.S. District Judge Paul A. Crotty of the Southern District of New York, he granted an injunction to the Upsolve legal advice program, arguing their right to offer legal advice was likely protected by the First Amendment. In 2023, he oversaw the sexual lawsuit case against Cuba Gooding Junior, which was settled before going to trial.

== Personal life ==
As of 1984, he lived in Stuyvesant Town in Manhattan.

== See also ==
- List of Cornell University alumni
- List of Georgetown University business alumni
- List of current United States district judges
- List of federal judges appointed by George W. Bush
- United States of America v. Campo and Flores

== Sources ==
- Paul A. Crotty Resume

Legal offices
Preceded by Harold Baer Jr.	Judge of the United States District Court for the Southern District of New York; 2005–2015	Succeeded by Lewis J. Liman
