= Harold Baer Jr. =

American judge (1933–2014)

Senior Judge of the United States District Court for the Southern District of New York
- In office September 8, 2004 – May 27, 2014

Judge of the United States District Court for the Southern District of New York
- In office August 10, 1994 – September 8, 2004
- Appointed by: Bill Clinton
- Preceded by: Robert W. Sweet
- Succeeded by: Paul A. Crotty

Personal details
- Born: Harold Baer Jr. February 16, 1933 New York City, U.S.
- Died: May 27, 2014 (aged 81) Stony Brook, New York, U.S.
- Education: Hobart College (BA); Yale University (LLB)

Harold Baer Jr. (February 16, 1933 – May 27, 2014) was a United States district judge of the United States District Court for the Southern District of New York.

== Early life and education ==
Born in New York City, New York, Baer received his Bachelor of Arts degree from Hobart College in 1954, where he was a member of Phi Beta Kappa. He received his Bachelor of Laws from Yale Law School in 1957.

== Early career ==
Baer's father, Harold Baer, was a longtime New York Supreme Court justice, born in New York City. Baer Jr.'s own legal career began as an assistant to the General Counsel of Greater New York Mutual Insurance in 1958. He was then Assistant Counsel to the New York State Commission on the Governmental Operations of the City of New York (1959–60) and New York State Commission of Investigation (1960–61). From 1961 to 1967 he was an Assistant United States Attorney in the Southern District of New York. He then served as Executive director, Civilian Complaint Review Board New York City Police Department from 1967 to 1968 before going back to the United States Attorney's office as Chief of the Criminal Division from 1970 to 1972. He was then an adjunct professor at New York Law School from 1974 to 1983.

== Judicial career ==
Baer was elected to serve in the New York Supreme Court for New York County in 1982 and served until 1992. While serving as a state trial judge, he was among the first in the United States to rule that a same-sex couple could be considered a family, so that the surviving member of the couple could benefit from tenant protections under the New York Rental Control laws. Although his decision was reversed by the Appellate Division, the Court of Appeals agreed with him in the landmark case of Braschi v. Stahl Associates Co. He was then Executive Judicial Officer for the Judicial Arbitration and Mediation Service, Inc from 1992 to 1994.

== Federal judicial service ==
He was nominated by President Bill Clinton to the United States District Court for the Southern District of New York on April 26, 1994, to fill a seat vacated by Judge Robert W. Sweet. He was confirmed by the United States Senate on August 9,1994 and received his commission the next day. He took senior status on September 8, 2004, serving in that status until his death in 2014.

== Notable cases ==
=== United States v. Bayless ===
Judge Baer found his judicial career in a firestorm in 1996 when he issued an opinion that suppressed evidence in a drug case in the case of United States v. Bayless, 913 F. Supp. 232 (S.D.N.Y. 1996). At the hearing, Judge Baer found that based on the testimony of the junior officer who claimed to have witnessed a drug transaction and the videotaped confession of the defendant, Carolyn Bayless, the police did not have reasonable suspicion sufficient for the arrest. In response to this ruling, two hundred members of Congress wrote to President Bill Clinton demanding that he seek Judge Baer’s resignation. White House Press Secretary Mike McCurry weighed in with a threatening statement, but later changed course when Second Circuit Judges, led by Chief Judge Jon Newman, excoriated the other two branches of government for their clearly unconstitutional demands and pointed out how the criticism had reached a level that threatened judicial independence. In the end, Judge Baer reversed his ruling following a rehearing during which the government presented a fuller case and the defendant inexplicably took the stand. See US v. Bayless, 921 F. Supp. 211 (S.D.N.Y. 1996). Judge Baer was criticized for this decision as well. He wrote about the experience in his book Judges Under Fire: Human Rights, Independent Judiciary, and the Rule of Law (2011).

=== Class Action Counsel Diversity ===
For requesting evidence of racial and gender diversity among counsel selected to provide representation in class action lawsuits, Judge Baer has been accused of "using his judicial authority to pursue his own personal socio-political agenda." Objectors to a class settlement from 2011 challenged the practice on appeal, but in a summary order the Second Circuit dismissed the issue for lack of standing: "Although objectors allege that staffing a case with an eye to diversity 'may interfere with [counsel's] ability to provide the best representation for the class,' they never contend that class counsel's representation was actually inferior." Summary Order at 8-9, Blessing v. Sirius XM Radio Inc., No. 11-3696 (2d Cir. Mar. 13, 2013) (ECF No. 649). The case and Judge Baer's class action diversity practice then came before the US Supreme Court, where in denying a petition for writ of certiorari, Justice Samuel Alito, concurring in the denial, nonetheless issued a decision criticizing Judge Baer's practices, for various stated reasons, warning "the meaning of the Court's denial of the petition should not be misunderstood." Martin v. Blessing, 134 S. Ct. 402 (Nov. 18, 2013). Notwithstanding the criticism from Justice Alito, district courts have continued to follow the precedent set by Judge Baer in considering diversity in the selection of class counsel.

== Death ==
Baer died on Tuesday, May 27, 2014.

== Case list ==
- Smith v. Islamic Emirate of Afghanistan, 262 F. Supp. 2d 217 (S.D.N.Y. 2003)
- US v. Bayless, 913 F. Supp. 232 (SDNY 1996); revised 921 F. Supp. 211 (SDNY 1996)
- Authors Guild v. HathiTrust (SDNY Oct. 10, 2012)

== Publications ==
- New York Evidentiary Foundations (1998), with Randolph N. Jonakait, E. Stewart Jones Jr., and Edward J. Imwinkelried.
- Judges Under Fire: Human Rights, Independent Judiciary, and the Rule of Law (2011).

== See also ==
- List of Jewish American jurists

Legal offices
Preceded by Robert W. Sweet	Judge of the United States District Court for the Southern District of New York; 1994–2004	Succeeded by Paul A. Crotty
