= Herman Baer =

American writer

Herman Baer (January 29, 1830 – January 2, 1901) was a German-American author.

He emigrated to America at the age of seventeen, and settled in Charleston, where he obtained employment as compositor and proof-reader in the office of the Southern Christian Advocate in 1848, in which year, too, he joined the Methodist Church. Baer taught German, French, and general topics in private families, and in 1852 became a teacher in the preparatory department of Wofford College (Methodist), in Spartanburg from which institution he himself graduated in 1858. In 1861 he took the degree of MD from the Charleston Medical College, and served as surgeon through the Civil War, on the close of which he engaged in business as a wholesale druggist in Charleston.

Throughout his life, Baer remained interested in literature, and he was a frequent contributor to church papers. Although a foreigner, he early acquired such a mastery of English as to be considered in his neighborhood an authority on English style. He married three times. In 1888 the Methodist Church Publishing House produced a book by Baer, entitled "Jewish Ceremonials."
