= Gretchen Baer =

American painter

Gretchen Baer (born 1963, in Oak Bluffs, Massachusetts) is an American painter and performance artist living in Bisbee, Arizona.

Baer is known for painting mile-long murals on the southern side of the US-Mexico border fence in collaboration with a group of Mexican children known as the "Border Bedazzlers."

Baer is also known for her art cars, including the "Hill Car" which features a large portrait of Hillary Clinton on the hood of a 1989 Toyota, and the "Fortune Telling Lion". During the 2008 Presidential Campaign, Baer founded the Hillary Clinton Army, raising money for the presidential candidate.

Baer is known for her colorful oil paintings and her flamboyant art, political and musically themed events. She formerly ran the El-Change-O! art gallery in Bisbee, Arizona.

== Books of Baer's work ==
- Blank, Harrod, "Wild Wheels". Blank Books, 2001. ISBN 9780933621688.
