= Harold Baer =

American judge

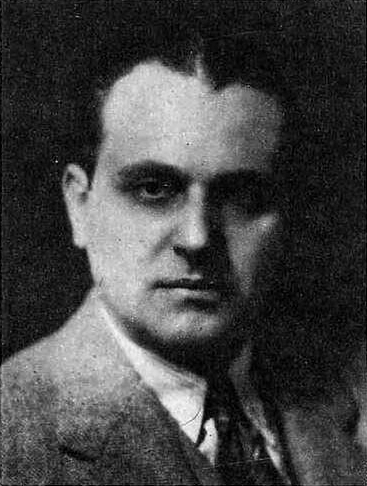
Baer c. 1951

Harold Baer Sr. (February 11, 1905 – September 3, 1987) was a long-serving New York Supreme Court justice. Baer was born in New York City, and was a member of the Class of 1923 at DeWitt Clinton High School and the New York University Law School. Baer's only child was Judge Harold Baer Jr. (1933–2014), who served on the United States District Court for the Southern District of New York.
