= Eva Baer =

Israeli art historian (1920–2017)

- Born: February 20, 1920; Berlin, Germany
- Died: January 8, 2017 (aged 96); Jerusalem
- Education: Hebrew University of Jerusalem; University of London (PhD)
- Spouse: Gabriel Baer
- Scientific career
- Workplaces: Tel Aviv University
- Thesis: Sphinxes and Harpies in Medieval Islamic Art (1963)

Eva Baer (February 20, 1920 – January 8, 2017) was an Israeli art historian who specialized in Islamic art.

== Biography ==
Born in Berlin, she was forced to emigrate from Nazi Germany in 1938 and moved to Palestine. She became a teacher and taught for ten years.

Between 1956 and 1959, Baer studied at the Hebrew University of Jerusalem, focusing on Islamic culture and civilization and on Byzantine and Islamic art and archaeology. She earned her doctorate from the University of London. Her advisor was David Storm Rice.

She was professor of art history at Tel Aviv University, where she taught from 1972 until her retirement in 1988, after which she was named professor emerita.

== Bibliography ==
=== Books ===
- Sphinxes and Harpies in Medieval Islamic Art: An Iconographical Study (1965)
- Metalwork in Medieval Islamic Art (1983)
- Ayyubid Metalwork With Christian Images (1988)
- Islamic Ornament (1998)
- Human Figure in Islamic Art (2004)
