= Efraín Antonio Campos Flores =

Venezuelan drug trafficker and nephew of President Maduro

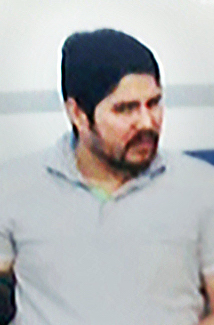
- Criminal charges: Importation of and intent to distribute controlled substances, including cocaine
- Criminal penalty: 18 years imprisonment
- Criminal status: Free
- Spouse: Jessair Rodriguez

Efraín Antonio Campos Flores is the nephew of Cilia Flores, the wife of Nicolás Maduro. He was involved in the Narcosobrinos incident, an alleged plot to send hundreds of kilograms of narcotics from Venezuela to the United States. On 14 December 2017 he was sentenced to 18 years in prison. He was freed on 1 October 2022, together with his cousin Franqui Flores, in exchange for seven Americans jailed in Venezuela.

== Early life and education ==
Campos spent his childhood living with his grandmother and over a dozen other family members until he was seven years old when a mudslide destroyed his home and he was adopted by his aunt Cilia Flores, an attorney at that time. Many of Campo's family members were and have continued to hold official positions in the Bolivarian Government of Venezuela.

In August 2015, two months prior to his arrest, Campos earned a law degree in Venezuela and had been living in an apartment with his then pregnant wife.

== Narcosobrinos incident ==
On 10 November 2015, Campos and his cousin Francisco Flores de Freitas, were arrested by the United States Drug Enforcement Administration in Port-au-Prince, Haiti after attempting to transport 800 kilograms of cocaine into the United States. In recorded conversations with informants, Campos described himself as being "the one in charge" and promised that no law enforcement in Venezuela would hinder drug shipments as planes would "depart ... as if ... some from our family were on the plane".

A year later on 18 November 2016, the First Lady's two nephews were found guilty of their charges, with the potential cash from drug trafficking allegedly being destined to "help their family stay in power". The two were later sentenced to 18 years in prison.

== Personal life ==
Campos is married to Jessair Rodriguez, with the couple having two children, both boys. His youngest son was born while Campos was incarcerated.

== See also ==
- Cartel of the Suns
- Crime in Venezuela
- Illegal drug trade in Venezuela
