= Gabriel Baer =

Israeli orientalist (1919–1982)

- גבריאל בר
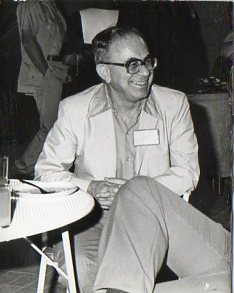
- Born: 13 January 1919; Berlin, Germany
- Died: September 22, 1982
- Education: PhD Hebrew University of Jerusalem, 1957; BSc American University of Beirut, The Hebrew Reali School
- Spouse: Eva Baer
- Awards: Israel Prize, 1976
- Scientific career
- Workplaces: The Hebrew University
- Academic advisors: Dr. Alfred Boneh

Gabriel Baer (Hebrew: גבריאל בר; 1919 – 1982) was a German-born Israeli orientalist, an expert on the social history of the 18th and 19th-century Middle East, notably Egypt but also the Ottoman Empire. Baer was born on 13 January 1919 in Berlin, Germany. He died in Jerusalem, Israel, on September 22, 1982.

== Activism ==
A Trotskyist activist in his youth, he was a member of the German section of the Fourth International.

In 1933, he left for Mandatory Palestine.

He became a member of the Hugim Marxistiim (Marxist Circles), the youth group of a faction of Poale Zion, the labour Zionist movement but left it in 1937 with Trotskyist theoretician and activist Tony Cliff to found the Brit Kommunistim Mahapchanin (the Revolutionary Communist League), a section of the Fourth International in Palestine. In the late 1940s he left Palestine for Britain where he became a member of the Revolutionary Communist Party writing a number of articles in its paper Socialist Appeal. When the RCP collapsed he became a member of the Socialist Review group led by Tony Cliff who had joined him in Britain.

Under the byline "S. Munir," he wrote several articles on the political and social situation in the Middle East in the late 1940s and early 1950s.

== Academic career ==
He studied Arab literature and Muslim history at the Hebrew University of Jerusalem and at the American University of Beirut.

Starting from 1954, he was a teacher at the Hebrew University, where he was instrumental in expanding the African and Asian Studies Institute there. He trained a whole generation of young scholars who were to become professors at Israeli universities.

In 1965, he founded the Journal of Asian and African Studies, which he edited until 1981. He was also, from 1953 to 1966, the editor of Hamisrah Hehadash (The New East), a journal published in Jerusalem by the Israel Oriental Society.

He died in Jerusalem, Israel, on September 22, 1982, being survived by his wife, Eva Baer, a specialist of Islamic art, who like him had emigrated to Palestine in 1938.

== Prize ==
In 1976, Gabriel Baer was one of the first two recipients of the Israel Prize for Arabic linguistics.

== Published works ==
A list of Baer's published works appeared in Journal of Asian and African Studies, vol. 17 (1983), p. 315-321.

=== Under the byline "S. Munir" ===
- Le Moyen-Orient depuis la guerre de Palestine (1949),
- La lutte anti-impérialiste des masses égyptiennes (1952),
- La fermentation sociale et le coup d’État militaire en Egypte (1952).

=== Books ===
- A History of Landownership in Modern Egypt, 1800-1950, Oxford University Press, 1962, 280 p.
- Egyptian Guilds in Modern Times, Volume 8 of Oriental notes and studies, Hevrah ha-Mizrahit ha-Yiśre’elit, Israel Oriental Society, 1964, 192 p. (review by P. M. Holt, in Bulletin of the School of Oriental and African Studies, vol. 29, issue 1 (February 1966), p. 154)
- Population and Society in the Arab East, International library of sociology and social reconstruction, Praeger, 1964 (new edition in 1976, by Greenwood Press, 275 p.)
- Studies in the Social History of Modern Egypt, Publications of the Center for Middle Eastern Studies, no. 4, Chicago, University of Chicago Press, 1969, 259 p. (review by Roger Owen in Middle Eastern Studies, vol. 9, No 1, January 1973, p. 115-118)
- Fellah and Townsman in the Middle East: Studies in Social History, London, Frank Cass, 1982, 338 p.

=== Articles ===
- Women and Waqf: An Analysis of the Istambul Tahrir of 1546, in Asian and African Studies, vol. 17 (1983), p. 9-27
- The Waqf as a Prop for the Social System (Sixteenth-Twentieth Centuries), in Islamic Law and Society, vol. 4, No. 3, 1997, p. 264-297

== See also ==
- List of Israel Prize recipients
