= Ronni Baer =

American art historian and curator (born 1954)

- Born: 1954 (age 71–72)
- Education: New York University, Institute of Fine Arts
- Occupations: Curator, art historian, professor

Ronni Baer (born 1954) is an American art historian and museum curator specializing in the art of the Netherlands and Spain in the seventeenth century.

She has curated many exhibitions and has contributed extensively to the study of seventeenth century art through her publications, lectures and museum projects.

== Career ==
Baer studied French literature as an undergraduate at Emory University, after which she received her PhD in art history from the Institute of Fine Arts, New York University, writing her dissertation on Gerrit Dou, who was Rembrandt's first pupil.

Baer held research, teaching and curatorial positions at numerous institutions in her early career including the Freer Gallery of the Smithsonian, the Museum of Modern Art, the National Gallery of Art, The Frick Collection, the Cooper-Hewitt Museum, the High Museum of Art, the University of Georgia, and the Michael C. Carlos Museum at Emory University.

Thereafter she was Senior Curator of European Paintings at the Museum of Fine Arts, Boston from 2000 to 2019.

In 2008 Baer was awarded an Encomienda de la Orden de Isabel la Católica by King Juan Carlos I of Spain, for her contributions to the promotion and study of Spanish art.

In 2017 she was appointed Knight-Commander in the Order of Orange-Nassau by King Willem-Alexander of the Netherlands, for her role in fostering relations between museums in the United States and in the Netherlands.

She is a member of CODART.

== Museum of Fine Arts, Boston (2000–2019) ==
Baer served as Senior Curator of European Paintings at the Museum of Fine Arts, Boston from 2000 to 2019. During her tenure, she oversaw the development and interpretation of the museum’s collection of Dutch and Flemish art.

In 2015 Baer staged the exhibition 'Class Distinctions' at the museum. It examined how seventeenth-century Dutch painters represented social hierarchy, class mobility, and economic identity during the Dutch Republic’s commercial rise. Princess Beatrix, the former Queen of the Netherlands, attended the opening in Boston. On display was Rembrandt's The Shipbuilder and his Wife, loaned from the Royal Collection, of then reigning monarch Queen Elizabeth II.

Near the end of her time at the museum she oversaw the acquisition of 113 paintings from the Van Otterloo and Weatherbie collections, which now form the foundation of the MFA’s Center for Netherlandish Art.

She played a central role in expanding the museum’s presentation of seventeenth-century Northern European painting and contributed to research, exhibition programming, and collection stewardship in this field.

== Princeton University Art Museum (2019–) ==
In 2019, she was appointed as the Allen R. Adler, Class of 1967, Distinguished Curator and Lecturer at the Princeton University Art Museum.

At Princeton Baer has taught seminars on Rembrandt and on the seventeenth-century Northern European paintings owned by the Princeton University Art Museum, acquired paintings for the museum by Peter Paul Rubens and Dou and has researched the university's collection of Dutch and Flemish paintings.

The latter led to her establishing Wild Boar Hunt, formerly catalogued as Death of Adonis, is an oil sketch painted by Rubens, created a year before his death.

== Major exhibitions ==
- Class Distinctions: Dutch Painting in the Age of Rembrandt and Vermeer (2015–2016).

This exhibition addressed the social stratification depicted in Dutch Golden Age painting and the relationship between art and society in the seventeenth-century Netherlands. Museum of Fine Arts, Boston: October 11-January 18, 2016 and Nelson-Atkins Museum of Art, Kansas City: February 20-May 29, 2016.

- El Greco to Velázquez: Art during the Reign of Philip III

This exhibition of paintings, sculpture and decorative arts was the first to place the late paintings of El Greco and the early works of Velázquez in context with other accomplished artists of their time. Organized in collaboration with Sarah Schroth. Museum of Fine Arts, Boston: April 20—July 27, 2008 and Nasher Museum at Duke University: August 22—November 9, 2008

- Rembrandt’s Journey: Painter, Draftsman, Etcher

An exhibition of twenty paintings, thirty drawings and 150 prints and copper plates spanning the artist's career, organized thematically to explore subjects that Rembrandt repeatedly returned to over time and in various media. Organized in collaboration with Clifford Ackley, Thomas Rassieur, and William Robinson; Museum of Fine Arts, Boston: October 26, 2003-January 18, 2004 and Art Institute of Chicago: February 14-May 9, 2004

- The Poetry of Everyday Life: Dutch Paintings in Boston Collections

An exhibition of about sixty seventeenth-century Dutch paintings, including landscapes, still lifes, portraits, and genre scenes from Boston collections. Museum of Fine Arts, Boston: June 12-September 22, 2002.

- Gerrit Dou (1613-1675): Master Painter in the Age of Rembrandt

The first monographic exhibition devoted to the artist since the seventeenth century. National Gallery of Art, Washington, D.C.: April 16-August 6, 2000; Dulwich Picture Gallery, London: September 6-November 19, 2000 and The Mauritshuis, The Hague: December 9, 2000-February 25, 2001

== Publications ==
- "In Search of Major Masters: Boston’s History of Collecting Flemish Baroque Painting." Essay in America and the Art of Flanders, edited by Esmée Quodbach, pp. 74–87. New York / University Park, PA: The Frick Collection / Penn State University Press, 2020. ISBN 978-0-271-08608-8
- "Image of Repentance: Dou’s Magdalen in Princeton." Essay in Connoisseurship: Essays in Honour of Fred G. Meijer, edited by C. Dumas, R. Ekkart, and C. Van de Puttelaar, pp. 28–33. Leiden: Primavera Pers, 2020. ISBN 978-90-5997-318-3
- Class Distinctions: Dutch Painting in the Age of Rembrandt and Vermeer. Ronni Baer, with essays by Henk van Nierop, Herman Roodenburg, Eric Jan Sluijter, Marieke de Winkel, and Sanny de Zoete. Catalogue of an exhibition held at Museum of Fine Arts, Boston in 2015–2016: MFA Publications, 2015. ISBN 978-0-87846-830-0
- Rembrandt’s Journey: Painter, Draftsman, Etcher. Clifford S. Ackley in collaboration with Ronni Baer, Thomas E. Rassieur, and William W. Robinson. Catalogue of an exhibition held in 2003 at Museum of Fine Arts, Boston and Art Institute of Chicago. ISBN 0-87846-677-0.
- "Murillo and the North." Essay in Murillo: From Heaven to Earth, edited by Guillaume Kientz, pp. 24–45. Fort Worth: Kimbell Art Museum, 2002. ISBN 978-0-300-26671-9
- The Poetry of Everyday Life: Dutch Painting in Boston. Catalogue of an exhibition held in 2002 in at Museum of Fine Arts, Boston, 147 pp. Boston: Museum of Fine Arts, 2002. ISBN 0-87846-631-2 (hardbound); ISBN 0-87846-645-2 (paperbound).
- Gerrit Dou, 1613-1675: Master Painter in the Age of Rembrandt. Ronni Baer, with contributions by Arthur K. Wheelock Jr. and Annetje Boersma. Catalogue of an exhibition held in 2000 at National Gallery of Art, Washington, D.C., Dulwich Picture Gallery, London, and Royal Cabinet of Paintings Mauritshuis, The Hague, 159 pp. ISBN 0-300-08369-6 (Yale University Press); ISBN 0-89468-248-2 (paperbound; National Gallery of Art).
- So Many Brilliant Talents: Art & Craft in the Age of Rubens. Catalogue of an exhibition held at Michael C. Carlos Museum, Atlanta in 1999, 210 pp. ISBN 1-928917-00-3.
