= Friederike Baer =

German-American historian

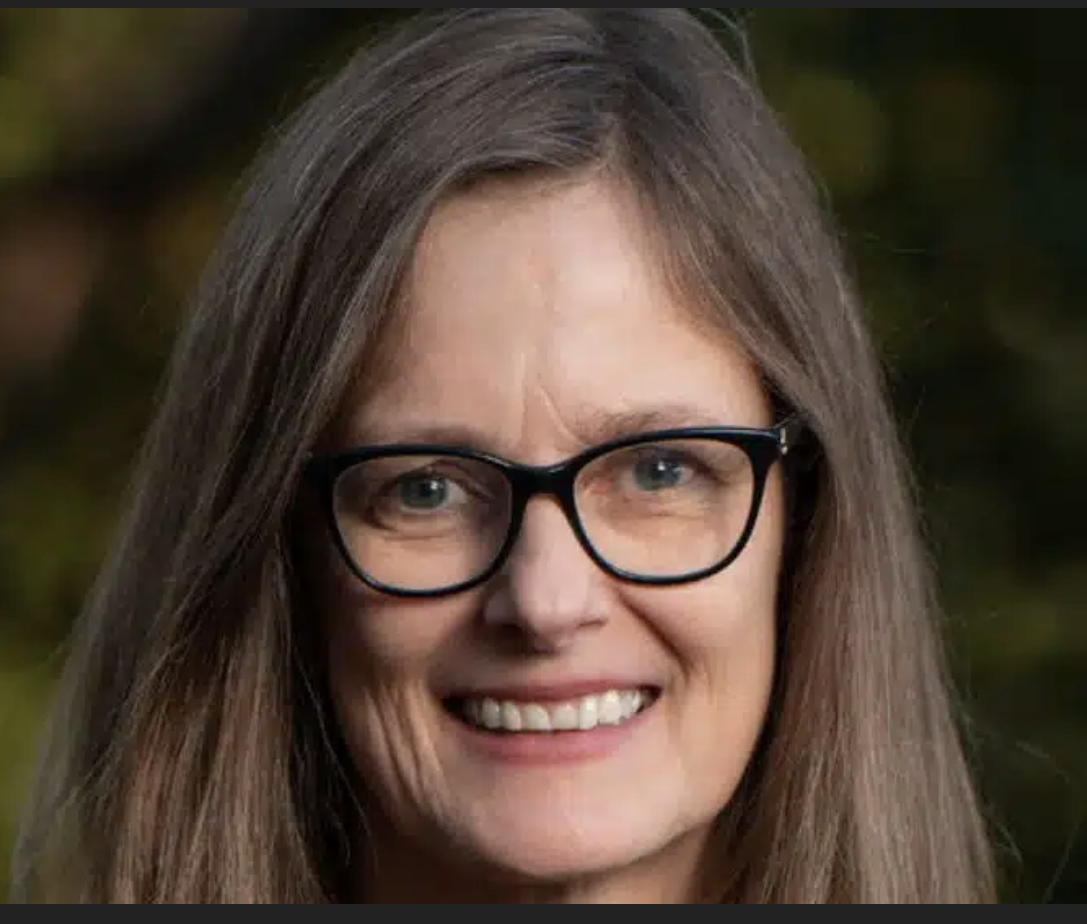
- Occupations: Professor, author, public speaker
- Awards: Society of the Cincinnati Prize, American Battlefield Trust Prize for History (Honorable Mention), American Revolutionary Roundtable of Philadelphia Annual Book Award, St. Paul's, Biglerville, Prize

Academic background
- Education: Georg‑August University; Boston College (BA); Brown University (MA, PhD)
- Doctoral advisor: Gordon S. Wood

Academic work
- Discipline: American History
- Institutions: Pennsylvania State University, Abington
- Notable works: Hessians: German Soldiers in the American Revolutionary War (Oxford University Press)
- Website: friederikebaer.com

Friederike Baer is a German-American historian specializing in early American history, including the experiences of German soldiers who fought with the British in North America during the Revolutionary War, and German-speakers in Philadelphia in the Early Republic.

== Early life and education ==
Baer was born and raised in Germany. After receiving her Abitur from the Kant Gymnasium in Berlin, she studied Cultural Anthropology and History at Georg‑August University in Göttingen before completing her bachelor's degree in history at Boston College, where she graduated summa cum laude. She earned both M.A. and Ph.D. degrees in History from Brown University, where she worked under the Pulitzer Prize winning historian Gordon S. Wood. Her doctoral dissertation explored the experiences of German-speaking Philadelphians in the early American Republic.

== Academic career ==
Baer has taught at the University of Georgia, Kutztown University, Temple University, and served as a project archivist at the American Philosophical Society. Since 2010 she has been at Penn State Abington, located just north of Philadelphia, where she is currently Professor of History and Division Head for Arts and Humanities.

In 2023, Baer received the prestigious Society of the Cincinnati Prize for her publication, Hessians: German Soldiers in the American Revolutionary War (Oxford University Press). The prize describes Hessians as “a landmark work that expands and enriches our understanding of this fascinating and important aspect of the American Revolution.” Hessians was also awarded the American Revolution Roundtable of Philadelphia Book of the Year Award and Honorable Mention for the Inaugural American Battlefield Trust Prize for History. Her monograph The Trial of Frederick Eberle: Language, Patriotism and Citizenship in Philadelphia's German Community, 1790-1830, was awarded the St. Paul's, Biglerville Prize for the best book in Lutheran church history.

In addition to public lecturing, she is a frequent guest on podcasts, such as Ben Franklin's World, The Napoleonic Wars Podcast, and History Happy Hour.. In 2024, she was elected to the Massachusetts Colonial Society. She served as an historical advisor for the documentary The American Revolution, a film by Ken Burns, Sarah Botstein and David Schmidt, which aired on PBS in November 2025.

Baer is a member of the Colonial Society of Massachusetts.

== Influence ==
Baer's scholarship—especially her book Hessians—is widely recognized for opening a new vista on the American Revolution by foregrounding the experiences and voices of the German auxiliary forces that were hired by Britain in the war against the American rebels. Her scholarship is particularly noteworthy for her extensive use of German-language archival materials and primary textual sources written in Kurrentschrift, much of which had not previously been utilized by scholars of the American Revolutionary War.

In Reviews in American History, Don Hagist, managing editor of the Journal of the American Revolution, writes:

Rarely does any one book completely obviate the need for any other, effectively replacing all previous works on the subject. Hessians is just such a book. It is not just an addition to a good library on the American Revolution, it may actually free up some space by making a few other books unnecessary. Books like that are rare, and welcome.

== Selected publications ==
- Hessians: German Soldiers in the American Revolutionary War. New York: Oxford University Press, 2022.
- The Trial of Frederick Eberle: Language, Patriotism and Citizenship in Philadelphia's German Community, 1790-1830. New York: New York University Press, 2008.
- “Christian Friedrich Daniel Schubart's Deutsche Chronik and the War of American Independence, 1774-1777.” Journal for Eighteenth-Century Studies 38 (3), (September 2015): 443-458.
- “The Decision to Hire German Troops in the War of American Independence: Reactions in Britain and North America, 1774-1776.” Early American Studies 13 (1), (Winter 2015): 111-150.
- “German-Americans, Nativism, and the Tragedy of Paul Schoeppe, 1869-1872.” The Journal of the Civil War Era 5 (1), (March 2015): 97-125.
