= Susan Baer =

Susan M. Baer
- Born: August 25, 1950; Allentown, Pennsylvania, U.S.
- Died: August 9, 2016 (aged 65); Montclair, New Jersey, U.S.
- Education: Barnard College; New York University
- Occupation: Transportation Executive
- Spouse: Joseph Martella
- Children: 3

Susan M. Baer (August 25, 1950 – August 9, 2016) was an American public servant who achieved several notable firsts. She was the first person to run all three major New York City airports and, in turn, the first woman to manage each of them. She was also the first female aviation director of the Port Authority of New York and New Jersey; and the first woman to manage the Lincoln Tunnel.

Baer was born in Allentown, Pennsylvania, on August 25, 1950. She obtained a BA in urban studies and anthropology from Barnard College in 1972 and an MA in business from New York University.

Baer began working for the Port Authority as a management analyst in 1976 and eventually managed LaGuardia Airport (1994–1998), Newark Liberty International Airport (–2007), and John F. Kennedy International Airport (–2008). She was appointed the authority's aviation director in 2009 by Christopher O. Ward.

In 2013, she joined Arup. Arup promoted her to the role of "Global Aviation Business Leader" in February 2016. She was also Vice Chair of the Board of Trustees of Vaughn College.

Baer married Joseph Martella, a Port Authority captain who headed police command for the World Trade Center prior to his retirement, and they had three children. She died on August 9, 2016, from cancer.
