= Yuval Baer =

Israeli architect

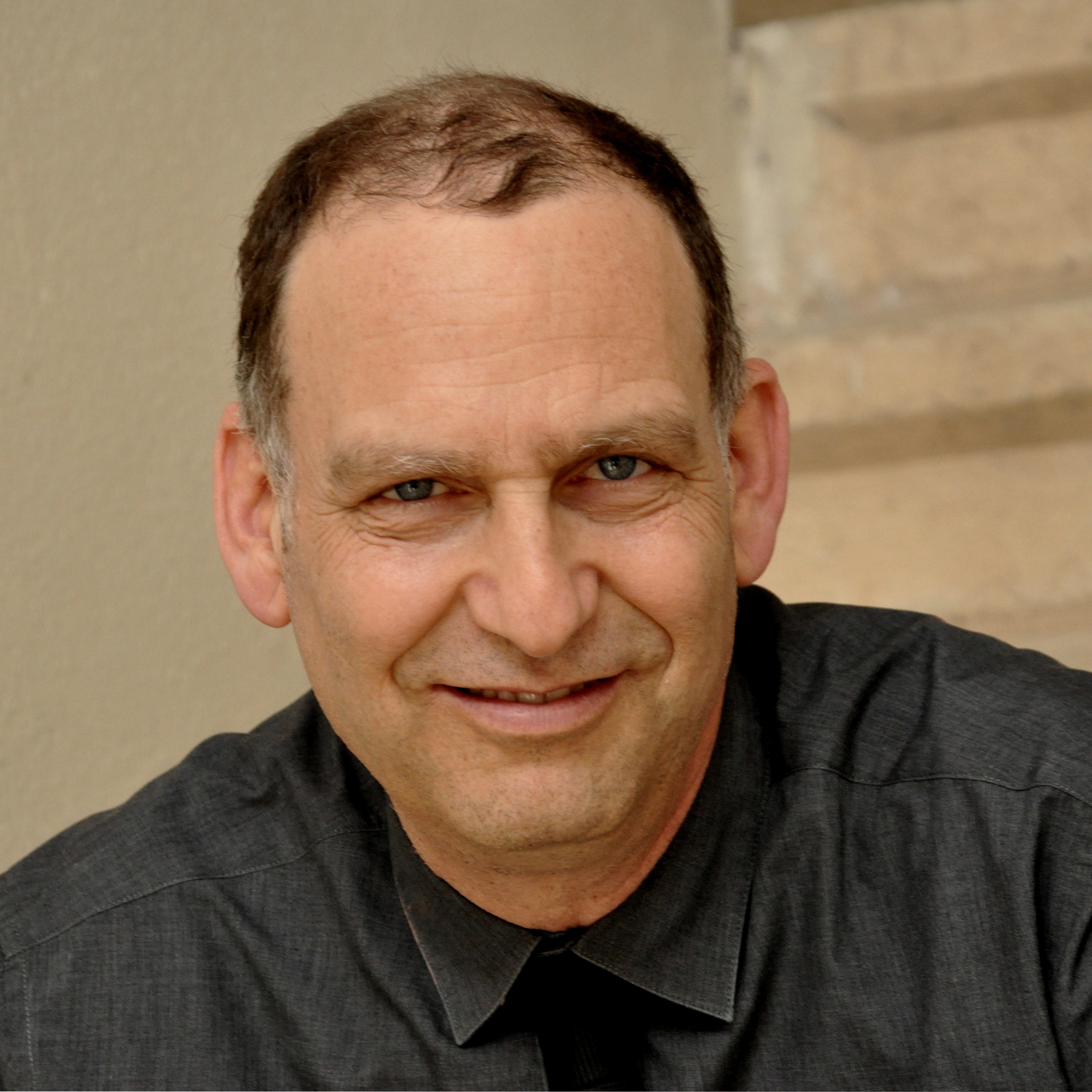
Yuval Baer

Yuval Baer (Hebrew: יובל בר; born 1958) is an Israeli architect and associate professor (artist) at Bezalel Academy of Arts and Design, based in Jerusalem. He exhibited at the ECC (European Cultural Center) during the Venice Biennale of Architecture, Eretz Israel Museum, and at the Ramat Gan Museum of Israeli Art; he partnered on projects with Foster and Partners and David Resnick. He was involved in the design and construction of the Institute For Medical Research, Israel-Canada, the National Library of Israel, the Einstein Archive at the Hebrew University, the BBC Middle East Bureau, Jerusalem, and the Edmond and Lily Safra Center for Brain Sciences.

== Biography ==
Yuval Baer grew up in Rehavia, Jerusalem, in a family of academics. From 1983 to 1985, he Studied architecture at the Illinois Institute of Technology. In 1988, he earned his B.Arch from the Technion Faculty of Architecture. He concluded his thesis project in New York, at the Pratt Institute, at the studio of Raimund Abraham, and in 1990, obtained his M.Sc. degree in Architecture and Building design at Columbia University. He worked at the office of Richard Meier in NYC and as an associate partner in the office of David Resnick in Jerusalem. In 2005, he opened his practice, YBGSNA, with Galit Shifman-Nathan, and in 2023, he opened an independent practice, BAER – Architecture & Urban Design. He collaborated on public projects in China with his Chinese partner APEX. The firm has a branch in Shenzhen, China. He partnered with Norman Foster on Edmond and Lily Safra Center for Brain Sciences at the Hebrew University of Jerusalem. He exhibited twice at the ECC (European Cultural Center) during the Venice Biennale of Architecture. Yuval Baer has been teaching at the Bezalel Academy of Arts and Design since 1992; in 1998, as a senior faculty member, in 2001, he was promoted to assistant professor 2001. In 2024, he was appointed an associate professor in the parallel artist track.

== Exhibitions ==
- 2002 - "The Resurrection of the Dead". Architectural Installation. The second Biennale for Israeli Ceramics. Eretz Israel Museum. Alisa Yemini (2004). Reporting from Israel.
- 2003 - "Pandora's Box," an Architectural Installation, a group exhibition in "Foot Note #8", the Anglican School Compound, Jerusalem. Curated by Sala-Manca Group, Lea Mouas, and Diego Rothman.
- 2005 – (second place in the competition). An Egalitarian Orthodox Synagogue for Kolech. A group exhibition at the Ramat Gan Museum of Israeli Art. Catalogue: A Synagogue as an Egalitarian Space.
- 2006 - The fourth Biennale for Israeli Ceramics. Eretz Israel Museum.
- 2021 – Architecture in the Age of the Anthropocene. “Metamorphosis”. Video Still. Venice Biennale of Architecture.
- 2024 - “The Four Season – an Evasive Harmony.” Venice Biennale of Architecture.
- 2024 – “Evasive Harmony”. Zemin Berlin Art Gallery.
- 2025 - Flüssige Matrix, The Ballery, Schöneberg, Berlin.
- 2025 - Out of Context, World Architecture Festival, Miami.

== Projects ==
- 2002 – Grand Egyptian Museum: an international architectural competition.
- 2003 - Nam June Paik Art Center, Seoul, Korea – an international Competition.
- 2003 - The School of Mechanical Engineering, Ben-Gurion University of the Negev, Be'er Sheva. Laboratories, teaching facility, and administration, with David Resnick.
- 2005 - The Middle East BBC Bureau, Jerusalem.
- 2007 - The New Bezalel Campus, Jerusalem – an international competition.
- 2007 - Baka Garden Apartments, Jerusalem.
- 2009 - The Cheongna City Tower, Cheongna International City, Korea – an international competition.
- 2011 - Institute For Medical Research, Israel-Canada, The Hebrew University.
- 2012 - National Library of Israel, Jerusalem – an international competition.
- 2013 - Newark Visitor’s Center, Newark, New Jersey – an international competition.
- 2013 - The Howard Johnson Resort Hotel, Emeishan, China.
- 2016 - Complex Cluster of Laboratories, designed for the Prime Minister's Office (Israel).
- 2016 - Edmond and Lily Safra Center for Brain Sciences, Laboratories and Teaching facilities. Designed with Foster and Partners for the Hebrew University.
- 2016 - Green Food Labs, Shenzhen, China.
- 2016 - The Kaunas Science Center, Kaunas, Lithuania – an international competition.
- 2017 - Villa Brown – A Boutique hotel, Jerusalem.
- 2017 - The Einstein Archive, The Hebrew University, Jerusalem. second place.

== Gallery ==
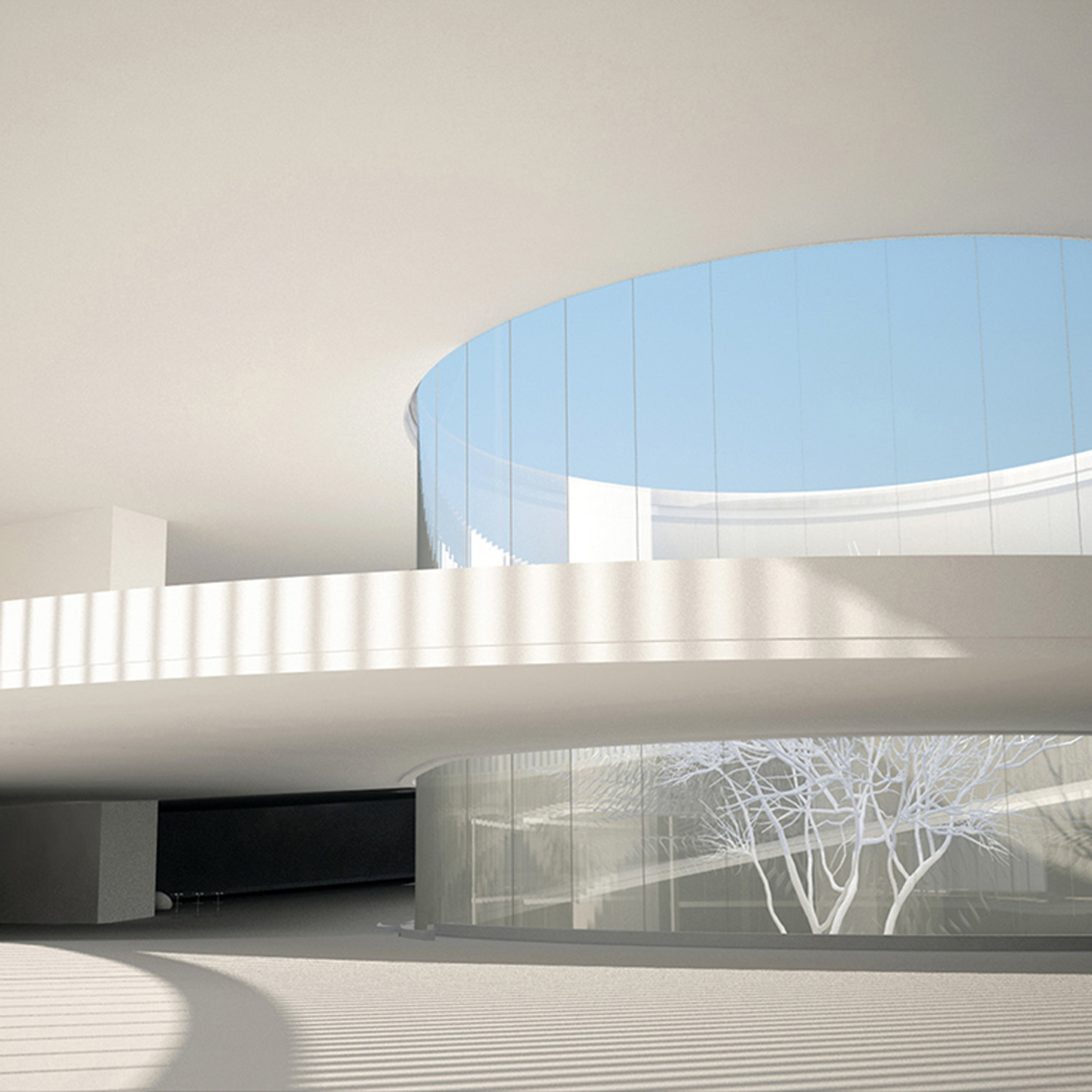
National Library of Israel, Jerusalem

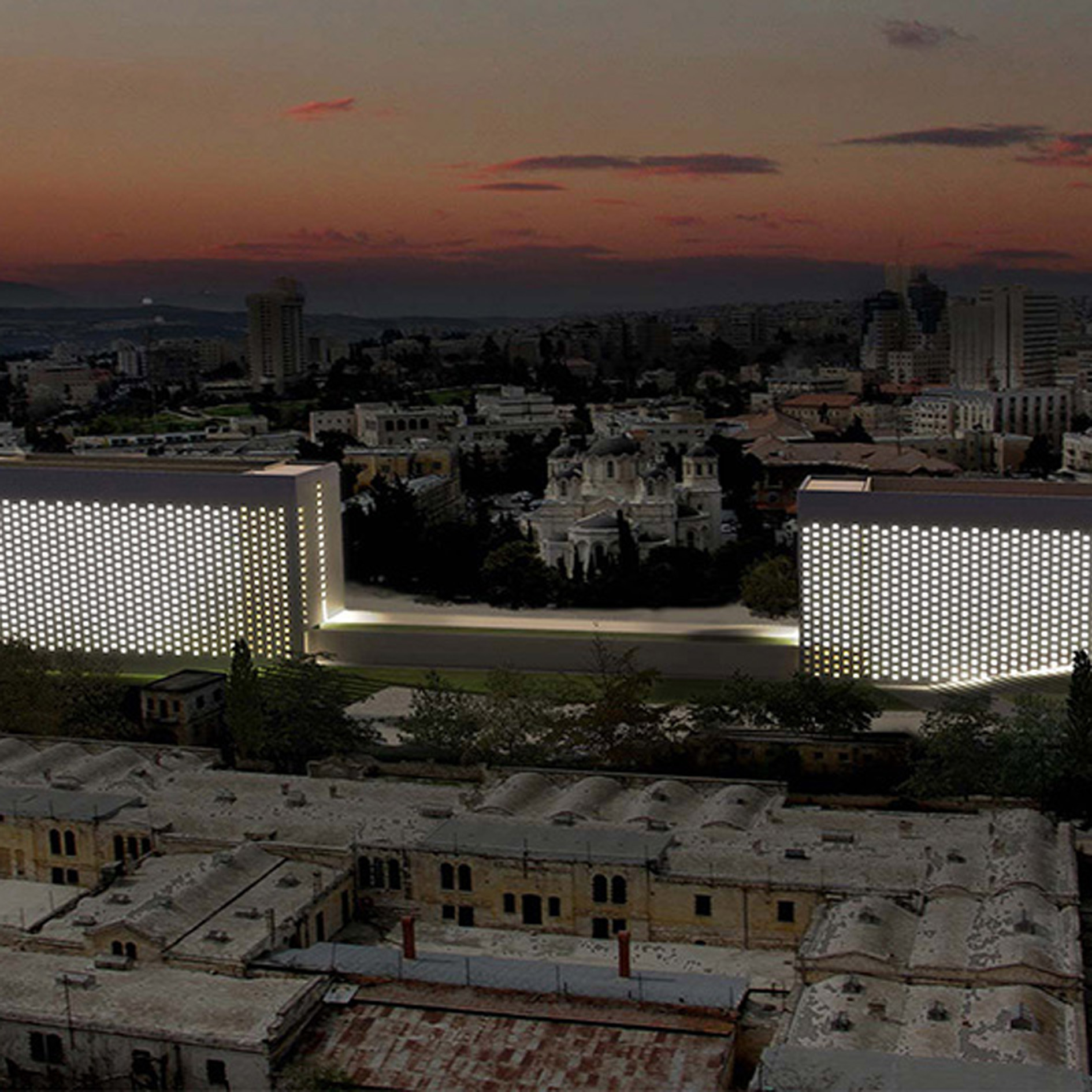
The New Bezalel Campus, Jerusalem

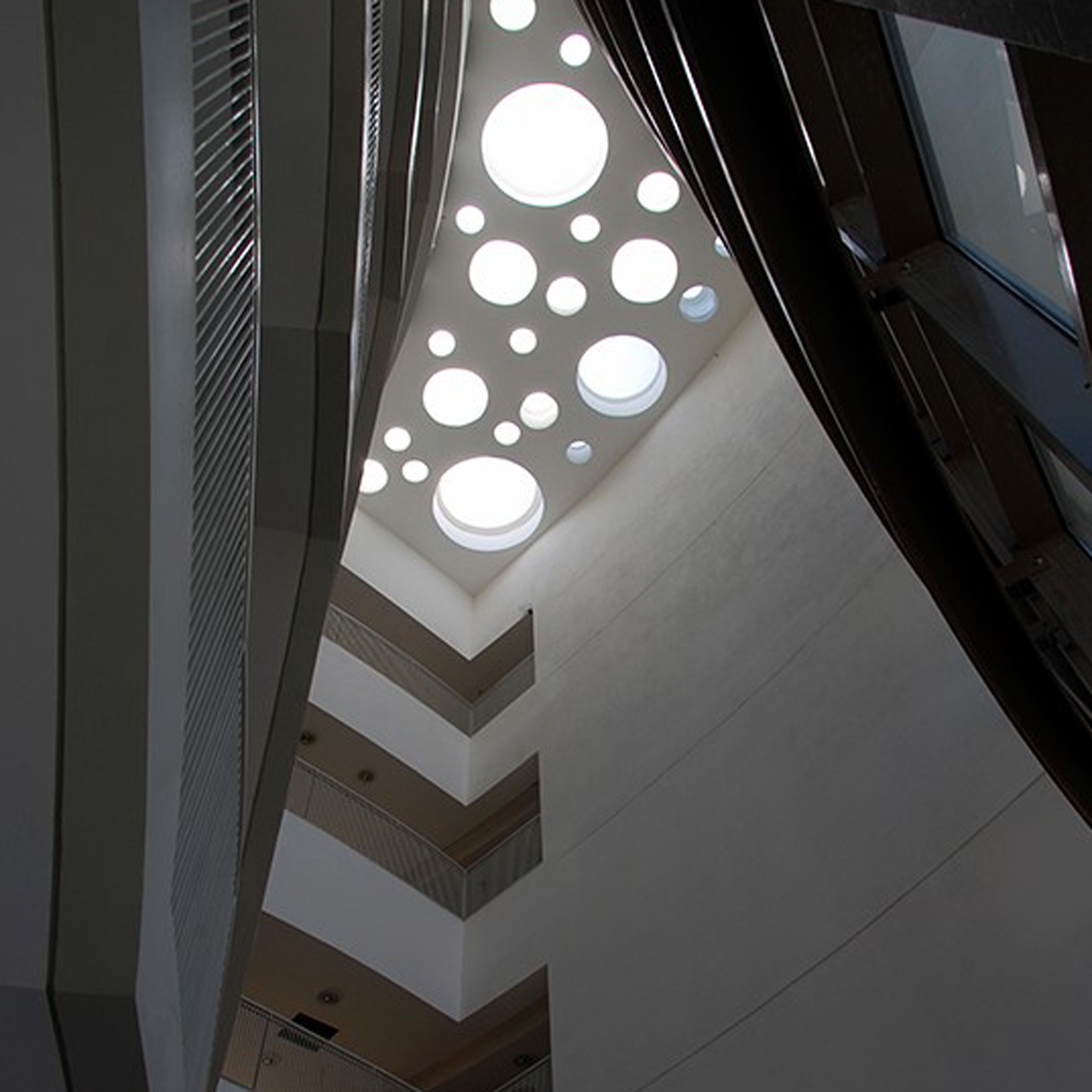
The Botnar Microbiology Labs, Hebrew University, Jerusalem
