= Jean Baer =

Jean-Georges Baer (12 February 1902 – 21 February 1975) was a Swiss parasitologist and environmentalist.

Born in England, he studied in Neuchâtel, Geneva, and in Paris, where he worked with Charles Joyeux. His book "Ecology of animal parasites" (1951) is considered a classic in the field. Baer published more than 250 articles, among them fundamental work on Temnocephalida (a kind of flatworm parasite) and on tapeworms.

Baer was a member of several scientific societies, vice president of the International Union of Biological Societies, and from 1958 to 1963 president of the International Union for Conservation of Nature (IUCN).

Baer's wood mouse (Hylomyscus baeri) is named in his honour.
