= Thomas S. Baer =

American jurist (1843–1906)

Associate Judge of the Supreme Bench of Baltimore City (now Circuit Court of Maryland for Baltimore City)
- In office 1903–1906

Maryland House of Delegates, Baltimore City District 2
- In office 1894–1894

Master in Chancery, Baltimore City
- In office 1894–1903

Personal details
- Born: March 17, 1843 Baltimore, Maryland, U.S.
- Died: July 18, 1906 (aged 63) Baltimore, Maryland, U.S.
- Party: Democratic
- Spouse: Elizabeth S. Beacham
- Education: Central High School of Baltimore, 1859; (now Baltimore City College)

Thomas S. Baer (March 17, 1843 – July 18, 1906) was an American jurist who served as a judge on the Supreme Bench of Baltimore (now the Circuit Court of Maryland for Baltimore City) in the United States of America from 1903 until his death in 1906.

== Biography ==
Baer was born in Baltimore, Maryland, on March 17, 1843, the son of Rev. John Baer, an elder/minister of the Baltimore Annual Conference of the Methodist Episcopal Church. He graduated from the Central High School of Baltimore (later renamed The Baltimore City College, 1868). Studied law in the office of William S. Waters. Admitted to the Maryland bar May 18, 1865.

He married Elizabeth S. Beacham (died December 26, 1891); they had no children. He died on July 18, 1906, aged 63, in Baltimore, Maryland.

=== Professional career ===
Baer's law practice specialized in equity and real estate matters. Practiced law with John T. McGlone, (1865–1872), and with Mr. Isaac McCurley, (1872–1875). Baer was elected to the Maryland House of Delegates in the General Assembly of Maryland from Baltimore City District 2, in 1894. He was also a member of the Baltimore City Board of School Commissioners from 1884 to 1888. The 18th President of the Bar Association of Baltimore City, (1896–1897), Baer taught law from at the University of Maryland School of Law, 1893–1903, where he lectured on real property, titles and copyrights.
