= Thomas M. Baer =

American physicist

Thomas Baer (born Baraboo, Wisconsin) is the executive director of the Stanford Photonics Research Center, a consulting professor in the applied physics department and an associate member of the Stem Cell Institute at Stanford University. His current scientific research is focused on developing imaging and biochemical analysis technology for exploring the molecular basis of human developmental biology and neuroscience. He received a B.A. in physics from Lawrence University in 1974, and a Ph.D. in atomic physics from the University of Chicago in 1979, where he studied with Professors Ugo Fano and Isaac Abella. After receiving his Ph.D. he worked with Nobel Laureate John L. Hall at JILA, University of Colorado, performing research on frequency stabilized lasers and ultra-high precision molecular spectroscopy.

== Career ==
Throughout his career Baer has been extensively involved with startup companies in Silicon Valley. In 2008 Baer co-founded Auxogyn, Inc., a diagnostic company devoted to advancing women’s health by developing technology for assisted reproduction and in vitro fertilization. Time Magazine selected the technology which formed the basis of Auxogyn products as one of the top ten medical breakthroughs of 2010. From 1996 to 2005 Baer was the CEO, chairman, and founder of Arcturus Bioscience, a biotechnology company located in Mountain View, CA, which he established in 1996. Arcturus Bioscience pioneered the area of Microgenomics by developing and manufacturing laser microdissection instrumentation and integrated bioreagent systems. Arcturus developed products that allowed precise genetic analysis of microscopic tissue samples and were integrated into a new generation of cancer diagnostic tests.

From 1992 to 1995 Baer was vice-president of research at Biometric Imaging, a company that developed laser scanning instruments for AIDS diagnosis, bone marrow transplants, and blood supply quality control. From 1981 to 1992 Baer was at Spectra-Physics, Inc. where he held positions of vice-president of research and senior research fellow. While at Spectra-Physics he developed technology that formed the basis for major Spectra-Physics product lines including optical pulse compressors, diode-pumped solid-state lasers, and modelocked Ti:Sapphire lasers. Products based on technology resulting from his research have generated over a billion dollars in commercial sales revenue.

== Honors ==
In 1994 he received the Lucia R. Briggs distinguished Alumni Award from Lawrence University and in 2000 he was named Entrepreneur of the Year for Emerging Companies by the Silicon Valley Business Journal. He has been elected to the status of Fellow in two international scientific societies, the American Association for the Advancement of Science and The Optical Society of America (OSA), and served as the president of OSA in 2009. In 2017 Baer was elected a Corresponding Fellow of the Royal Society of Edinburgh (CorrFRSE).

He is a visiting professor at the University of Strathclyde in Glasgow, Scotland.

Baer received an honorary doctorate from Heriot-Watt University in 2012

In 2012, he was also awarded the Robert E. Hopkins Leadership Award by the Optical Society (OSA).

== Patents held ==
Baer holds more than 85 patents and his commercial products have received many industry awards for design innovation
