= Exhibit (legal) =

Legal evidence presented to a jury

An exhibit, in a criminal prosecution or a civil trial, is a physical or documentary evidence brought before the jury. The artifact or document itself is presented for the jury's inspection. Examples may include a weapon allegedly used in the crime, an invoice or written contract, a photograph, or a video recording.

The main concept behind correct evidence handling is that the item recovered is the same as that produced in the court room.

The usual term applied to such handling is "chain of custody". The term denotes the links in the handling of the exhibit in question. For example, details of the item, the place, date, time it was recovered, and by whom it was recovered - the first link. The subsequent links in the chain refer to anyone required to handle the exhibit, mainly for identification purposes. The final link is the production of the item in court. This particular level of auditable handling is paramount when dealing with items of a forensic nature, as it reduces the opportunity for the defense to challenge the authenticity of the item.

The chain of custody can be less stringent when dealing with property which has a unique identifying feature like a serial number. In such a case, the physical security becomes the main concern of the person recovering the item. Such security is normally achieved by booking the item into a central evidence room.

The exhibits in any one law case are often labelled Exhibit A, Exhibit B, Exhibit C, etc. to distinguish between them.

== Exhibit Preparation ==
The logistical process of preparing evidence for court presentation is known as exhibit preparation. This involves several steps essential for the proper introduction and management of evidence:

Labeling (Exhibit Stickers): Physical documents and media are affixed with official exhibit stickers (labels). These labels formally mark the document and may include fields to denote whether the exhibit is being used for a deposition or a trial, case name, and so on.

Cover Pages (Slipsheets): When exhibits are attached to formal court filings, such as motions or discovery responses, a separate cover page, known as a slipsheet, is often inserted before each exhibit. This page clearly identifies the exhibit number or letter and title for the court and opposing counsel.

Exhibit Lists: A comprehensive, sequentially numbered exhibit list must be created. This list tracks the exhibit number, a brief description of the item, and notes on when and if the exhibit was formally admitted into evidence.

Historically, exhibit preparation was a manual, time-intensive process. However, this function is increasingly handled via software automation. Dedicated litigation support tools, such as Exhibit Flow, automate the generation and insertion of exhibit stickers, slipsheets, and the creation of exhibit lists.

== Other uses ==
In personal injury cases, a legal or medical exhibit is created containing drawings or illustrations of human anatomy with graphic, medically accurate depictions of injuries and surgeries sustained by the plaintiff as a result of an accident or injury. Legal exhibits are commonly used by trial attorneys in personal injury cases to maximize the value of the case, enhance settlement negotiations, increase effectiveness of medical expert testimony and maximize trial presentation. The most common types of personal injury claims are road traffic accidents, accidents at work, tripping accidents, assault claims, accidents in the home, product defect accidents (product liability) and holiday accidents. This also includes medical or dental accidents and wrongful death cases resulting from the negligence of a health care provider.
