= John Metz Baer =

American educational psychologist

- Education: Yale University (B. A.), Rutgers University (Ph.D)
- Scientific career
- Workplaces: Rider University

John Baer is a professor of Educational Psychology at Rider University in New Jersey. He earned his B.A. from Yale University (double major, psychology and Japanese Studies, magna cum laude) and his Ph.D. in cognitive and developmental psychology from Rutgers University.

His research on the development of creativity and his teaching have won national awards, including the American Psychological Association's Berlyne Prize and the National Conference on College Teaching and Learning's Award for Innovative Excellence. His primary research focus is the domain specificity of creativity, which argues that creativity is not a general set of skills but rather that creative-thinking skills vary by domain, making creativity in one domain not predictive of creativity in other domains. He developed the Amusement Park Theory of creativity (with James C. Kaufman)

His books include There's No Such Thing as Creativity: How Plato and 20th Century Psychology Have Misled Us (Cambridge University Press, 2022), Domain Specificity of Creativity (Academic Press/Elsevier; 2016), Teaching for Creativity in the Common Core Classroom (with R. A. Beghetto & James C. Kaufman; Teachers College Press, 2015), Being Creative Inside and Outside the Classroom (with James C. Kaufman; Sense Publishers, 2003), Creativity and Divergent Thinking: A Task-Specific Approach (Erlbaum, 1993), Creative Teachers, Creative Students (Allyn and Bacon, 1997), Creativity Across Domains: Faces of the Muse (with James C. Kaufman; Erlbaum, 2005), Reason and Creativity in Development (with James C. Kaufman; Cambridge University Press, 2008); Are We Free? Psychology and Free Will (with James C. Kaufman & Roy Baumeister; Oxford University Press, 2005), Essentials of Creativity Assessment (with James C. Kaufman and Jonathan A. Plucker; Wiley, 2008), and Creatively Gifted Students Are Not Like Other Gifted Students (with K. H. Kim, James C. Kaufman, & B. Sriraman; Sense Publishers, 2013). He also collaborated with A. J. Lemaster in the development of the modern shorthand program SuperWrite.

He is a Fellow of the American Psychological Association, and he has received research grants from the National Science Foundation, the Educational Testing Service, the National Center for Educational Statistics, the Carnegie Foundation, and Yale, Rutgers, and Rider Universities. He serves on the editorial boards of the Psychology of Aesthetics, Creativity, and the Arts; the Journal of Creative Behavior; and the International Journal of Creativity and Problem Solving.
