= List of Americans wrongfully imprisoned or detained abroad =

This list encompasses Americans imprisoned or wrongfully detained abroad by state and non-state actors and includes both citizens of the United States and legal permanent residents. It consists of individuals who have been wrongfully detained through various channels, including criminal conviction, hostage diplomacy, and kidnapping. It does not include prisoners of war or war-time kidnappings.

Since 2015, the Special Presidential Envoy for Hostage Affairs (SPEHA) leads and coordinates activities across the Executive Branch to bring home Americans held hostage or wrongfully detained in foreign countries. Non-governmental organizations that advocate for the return of Americans wrongfully detained abroad include the Richardson Center for Global Engagement, the James Foley Legacy Foundation, and the Bring Our Families Home Campaign.

== Africa ==
=== Egypt ===
Name	Detained	Status	Days in detention	Reason for detention
Mohamed Amashah	April 2019	Released; 5 July 2020	~461	An Egyptian-American dual-citizen and New Jersey medical student who was arrested in Tahrir Square during a protest advocating for the release of falsely imprisoned people in Egypt.
Reem Desouky	July 2019	Released; 3 May 2020	~301	An Egyptian-American dual-citizen schoolteacher, she was detained for her Facebook page critical of the Egyptian president.
Aya Hijazi	1 May 2014	Released; 21 April 2017	1,086	An Egyptian-American dual-citizen and humanitarian, who ran an NGO focused on helping homeless children. During a government crackdown on NGOs, she was arrested on charges of child abuse without evidence and later found innocent by an Egyptian court.
Mustafa Kassem	August 2013	Died while in detention	~2,356	An auto parts dealer and cab driver in New York who travelled to Egypt to visit family in 2013. He was arrested by security forces while shopping the night before he was scheduled to fly back to the US, during a crackdown on dissidents during the 2011 Egyptian Revolution. in 2020 he died of heart failure caused by a myriad of medical conditions and inhumane treatment whilst being detained.

=== Libya ===
Name	Detained	Status	Days in detention	Reason for detention
Clare Morgana Gillis	5 April 2011	Released; 19 May 2011	44	A journalist who was kidnapped along with James Foley, beaten repeatedly, and released along with Spanish journalists in Tripoli.

=== Mozambique ===
Name	Detained	Status	Days in detention	Reason for detention
Ryan Koher	4 November 2022	Released; 5 October 2023	1478	Ryan was a missionary pilot, arrested trying to fly supplies to an orphanage in northern Mozambique and was held without charges or bail. He was provisionally released but forbidden from leaving country on 15 March 2023.

=== Rwanda ===
Name	Detained	Status	Days in detention	Reason for detention
Paul Rusesabagina	31 August 2020	Released; 25 March 2023	2273	Arrested on charges of terrorism, arson, kidnap and "murder perpetrated against unarmed, innocent Rwandan civilians on Rwandan territory." At the time of his detention, Paul was a US Green Card holder.

=== Somalia ===
Name	Detained	Status	Days in detention	Reason for detention
Jessica Buchanan	24 October 2011	Released; 25 January 2012	93	A humanitarian aid worker, who was involved in a demining project with a Danish aid group, was kidnapped by Somali pirates in Galkayo who demanded the U.S. government pay a $45 million ransom. She was rescued, along with a Danish captive, in a raid by US Navy SEALs where nine of the pirates were killed.
Michael Scott Moore	19 January 2012	Released; 22 September 2014	977	Journalist and novelist, he was in Somalia researching a book on Somali pirates Pulitzer Center for Crisis Reporting when he was abducted by a local gang of pirates and held for ransom.

== Asia ==
=== Afghanistan ===
Name	Detained	Status	Days in detention	Reason for detention
Amir Amiri	December 2024	Released; 28 September 2025	~301	A U.S. citizen, detained and imprisoned by the Afghan government, was released after months of negotiations facilitated by representatives of Qatar.
Ryan Corbett	10 August 2022	Released; 20 January 2025	894	Worked for an education-focused NGO and was detained by Afghanistan in Kabul.
Dennis Coyle	January 2025	Released; 24 March 2026	~447	A U.S. citizen from Colorado who was working as a linguistics researcher, detained and imprisoned by Afghanistan, and was released after negotiations facilitated by representatives of the United Arab Emirates.
Mark Frerichs	31 January 2020	Released; 19 September 2022	962	Kidnapped by the Haqqani network while working as an engineering contractor.
George Glezmann	5 December 2022	Released; 20 March 2025	836	Detained by Afghanistan while on a cultural and archeological visit to the country, he was kept in solitary confinement and periodically tortured.
Mahmood Habibi	10 August 2022	Detained	1564	Detained while working as a contractor for a telecommunications company.
Kevin King	11 August 2016	Released; 20 November 2019	101	A professor at the American University of Afghanistan who was abducted by the Haqqani network, along with an Australian professor, in retaliation for the detention of Anas Haqqani.
Paul Overby	17 May 2014	Detained	4571	An author, last seen in Khost when he was on his way to Waziristan in Pakistan to interview Sirajuddin Haqqani. He is believed to have been taken by the Taliban, the Haqqani Network or an affiliated group. Journalist and former U.S. hostage David Rodhe noted that Overby is still in captivity.
David Rohde	10 November 2008	Released; 19 June 2009	221	A New York Times journalist who was kidnapped by the Taliban while doing research for a book. He was moved to a Taliban compound near the border with Pakistan and later escaped.
Ivor Shearer	17 August 2022	Released; 20 December 2022	125	Independent filmmaker and journalist held by Afghanistan.

=== Cambodia ===
Name	Detained	Status	Days in detention	Reason for detention
Theary Seng	19 March 2022	Detained	~1708	Cambodian-American human rights lawyer arrested for supporting democratic reforms and sentenced to six years in prison for treason in a mass-trial.

=== China ===
Name	Detained	Status	Days in detention	Reason for detention
Mao Chenyue	18 July 2025	Released; 17 September 2025	491	A Chinese-born U.S. Citizen who lives in Atlanta, Ms. Chenyue works as an executive at Wells Fargo. She was prevented from returning to the U.S. without explanation.
Kai Li	September 2016	Released; 27 November 2024	~3,009	Detained for espionage after flying into Shanghai in relation to a U.S.-based export business he had started.
David Lin	2006	Released; 16 September 2024	5,844	Detained while establishing a missionary training school in Beijing, later charged with fraud and sentenced to life in prison.
Mark Swidan	13 November 2012	Released; 27 November 2024	4,397	Detained on a drug charge during a photography trip to China and sentenced to death in 2018.
Youlin Chen	5 November 2024	Detained	746	Chinese-American seismologist detained on espionage charges in 2024.
Min Zin	3 June 2026	Detained	171	Myanmar-born expert in China's role in the Myanmar civil war, Zin was subsequently detained for "suspected of spying and endangering Chinese national security".

=== Iran ===
Name	Detained	Status	Days in detention	Reason for detention
Reza Valizadeh	September 22, 2024	Detained	790	Dual Iranian American national and journalist, who returned to Iran for the first time since 2009 in 2024 to care for his family. He was arrested and sentenced to 10 years in prison for "collaborating with a hostile government."
Shahab Dalili	2016	Released; May 2026	~3,448	A U.S. Green Card holder, who moved to the U.S. in 2016 after retiring as a commercial shipping captain, was arrested in 2016 after returning to Iran for his father's funeral and charged with espionage.
Amir Hekmati	August 2011	Released; 16 January 2016	~1,629	A former U.S. Marine from Arizona, he was arrested on charges of spying for the CIA and sentenced to death in 2012. His sentence was overturned and a retrial ordered, and he was later freed in a prisoner exchange. Amir successfully sued Iran for wrongful detention in 2017.
Robert Levinson	9 March 2007	Deceased while in detention	4765	Former DEA and FBI agent who disappeared in Iran and was presumed wrongfully detained by the Iranian government or other state-sponsored actors. He was declared dead in absentia in 2020, and his disappearance resulted in a shift in U.S. policy around hostage-taking.
Baquer Namazi	22 February 2016	Released; 5 October 2022	2,417	A former diplomat working for UNICEF, he was detained on charges of espionage after he travelled to Iran to visit his son, Siamak Namazi, who was also wrongfully detained in Iran at the time.
Siamak Namazi	13 October 2015	Released; 18 September 2023	2,895	Detained on charges of espionage and sentenced to 10 years in prison.
Emad Shargi	30 November 2020	Released; 18 September 2023	1,022	Detained on charges of espionage and sentenced to 10 years in prison in 2021 after having been previously cleared of all charges in 2019.
Morad Tahbaz	January 2018	Released; 18 September 2023	~2,086	An environmentalist and co-founder of the Persian Wildlife Heritage Foundation (PWHF), Tahbaz was arrested in Iran along with other PWHF members who were accused of being Israeli spies.
Michael White	22 July 2018	Released; 4 June 2020	683	A U.S. Navy veteran who travelled to the Iranian city of Mashhad to meet his girlfriend, and was arrested and sentenced to 10 years in prison for "sharing a private photograph" and "insulting the supreme leader." He has later released to the Swiss embassy and returned to the U.S. shortly thereafter. He has filed a $1 Billion lawsuit against Iran in relation to his wrongful detention.

=== Japan ===
Name	Detained	Status	Days in detention	Reason for detention
Ridge Alkonis	21 May 2021	Released; 12 January 2024	966	A United States Navy lieutenant involved in a car crash resulting in the deaths of two Japanese citizens, he was found guilty of negligent driving and sentenced to three years imprisonment. His case caused tension between the U.S. and Japan, particularly surrounding the exclusion of critical defense evidence and lack of basic due process. He was later transferred to U.S. custody and released.

=== Kuwait ===
Name	Detained	Status	Days in detention	Reason for detention
Ahmed Shihab-Eldin	3 March 2026	Released; 23 April 2026	51	A journalist initially detained for resharing news articles about the Iran war, arrested on charges of "spreading false information", "harming national security", and "misusing his mobile phone".

=== Lebanon ===
Name	Detained	Status	Days in detention	Reason for detention
Terry A. Anderson	16 March 1985	Released; 4 December 1991	2454	A former U.S. Marine and journalist for the Associated Press, he was kidnapped by the Islamic Jihad Organization after a game of tennis with a friend on his day off.
Amer Fakhoury	12 September 2019	Deceased as a result of detention	189	Lebanese-American restaurateur who was kidnapped by Hezbollah while visiting Beirut, later charged with a decades-old murder and finally released in March 2020. He developed late-stage Epstein Barr Virus related lymphoma while detained and died in August 2020.

=== Myanmar ===
Name	Detained	Status	Days in detention	Reason for detention
U Zawta	13 November 2024	Released; 30 October 2025	351	A Buddhist monk, Myanmar-American dual-citizen, and leader of the All Burma Monks' Alliance. One of the leaders of the Saffron Revolution in Myanmar, who fled country after suppression. Returned to the country on a religious visa after junta promised not to persecute him, but was still detained, tortured, and sentenced to 15 years in prison on charges of "supporting revolutionary terrorists". He was released without exchange after US pressure.

=== Pakistan ===
Name	Detained	Status	Days in detention	Reason for detention
Warren Weinstein	13 August 2011	Deceased while in detention	1251	USAID consultant working for an NGO, he was kidnapped by Al-Qaeda and was accidentally killed in a drone strike on the Afghanistan-Pakistan border.

=== Saudi Arabia ===
Name	Detained	Status	Days in detention	Reason for detention
Saad Almadi	21 November 2021	Released; 19 November 2025	1459	71-year-old Saudi-American dual citizen who was arrested in Saudi Arabia and later, in October 2022, was found guilty on "terrorism" charges and sentence to 16 years in prison for 14 tweets criticizing the Saudi government and the Crown Prince Mohammed bin Salman in particular. In February 2023, his sentence was increased to 19 years on government appeal, but month later all "terrorism" charges were dropped and reclassified as less serious cybercrimes, as a result of which he was released from prison with ban from traveling outside the country until retrial. In September 2025, he was found guilty in a retrial on cybercrime charges and was not sentenced to additional prison time, but was banned from leaving the country until March 2026. Travel ban was lifted ahead of schedule and he was released from the country after US pressure.

=== Syria ===
Name	Detained	Status	Days in detention	Reason for detention
James Foley	22 November 2012	Deceased while in detention	635	A journalist during the Syrian Civil War, he was abducted by ISIS and later murdered by decapitation in August 2014. His wrongful detention and death led to his family founding the James W. Foley Legacy Foundation, the most prominent advocacy group for American hostages and wrongful detainees.
Majd Kamalmaz	15 February 2017	Deceased while in detention	4296	A psychotherapist, he was running a nonprofit in Lebanon helping refugees deal with trauma when he drove to Syria in mid-February 2017 to visit a relative who had cancer. Once in Damascus, he called his wife to tell her that he had arrived safely. After that, the family never heard from him again. It was widely reported that he died while wrongfully detained in May 2024.
Kayla Mueller	13 August 2012	Deceased while in detention	907	A humanitarian aid worker with Doctors Without Borders who was kidnapped in Aleppo and later killed.
Austin Tice	13 August 2012	Detained	5213	An American freelance journalist and a veteran U.S. Marine Corps officer who was kidnapped while reporting in Syria on August 13, 2012. He is the longest-held American journalist.
Travis Timmerman	5 June 2024	Released; 8 December 2024	186	Last seen in Budapest, he travelled to Syria via Lebanon on a Christian pilgrimage and was detained at the border. He was discovered by locals in a suburb of Damascus wandering barefoot during the Fall of the Assad regime.

=== United Arab Emirates ===
Name	Detained	Status	Days in detention	Reason for detention
Zack Shahin	March 2008	Detained	~6839	A former Pepsi executive, he was hired as a CEO of a real estate company in Dubai. During a business meeting he was kidnapped, tortured, and forced to sign confessions for myriad crimes including, bribery, embezzlement, and fraud. He was sentenced to 47 years in prison and designated 'arbitrarily detained' by the U.N. Working Group on Arbitrary Detention in 2022.

== Europe ==
=== Denmark ===
Name	Detained	Status	Days in detention	Reason for detention
Owen Ray	31 March 2025	Detained	600	A college student traveling in Europe for spring break when he was attacked by a disgruntled Uber driver in Denmark. Arrested at the airport by Danish police for assault and spent 2.5 weeks in prison before being released on bail, but is prevented from leaving Denmark despite not being charged.

=== Italy ===
Name	Detained	Status	Days in detention	Reason for detention
Amanda Knox	6 November 2007	Released; 3 October 2011	1427	Arrested in Italy and wrongfully convicted for the murder of Meredith Kercher, she was acquitted by the Supreme Court of Italy.

=== Russia ===
Name	Detained	Status	Days in detention	Reason for detention
David Barnes	13 January 2022	Detained	1773	He was detained in Russia on accusations of child abuse he allegedly committed while living in Texas, but which were unfounded according to Texas law enforcement. He was sentenced to 21 years in a labor camp.
Gordon Black	2 May 2024	Detained	933	A U.S. soldier who was arrested after an argument with his girlfriend over $113 and sentenced to four years in prison.
Michael Calvey	15 February 2019	Released; 13 November 2020	637	A businessman from Wisconsin, Calvey had spent decades helping to create large technology companies, like Yandex, by building and growing investment firms in Russia. He because involved in a commercial dispute with another finance company, the managers of which fabricated a fraud case against Calvey and ordered his arrest. He was detained in prison, and later under house arrest, until his release in 2020.
Marc Fogel	15 August 2021	Released; 11 February 2025	1276	A teacher working at an English language school, he was arrested entering Russia with medical marijuana for which he had a valid prescription and entry clearance.
Evan Gershkovich	29 March 2023	Released; 1 August 2024	491	A journalist for The Wall Street Journal, he was arrested on his way to meet a fellow reporter for dinner and charged with espionage. He was sentenced to 16 years in prison during a secret trial, but was later released as part of the 2024 Ankara prisoner exchange.
Robert Gilman	17 January 2022	Released; 11 August 2026	1769	A former U.S. Marine, who taught English in Poland, was transiting Russia on his way to Moldova when he became ill and was arrested for assault of a police officer and was later tortured in prison and charged with additional crimes.
Brittney Griner	17 February 2022	Released; 8 December 2022	294	A WNBA player and Olympic gold medalist, she was detained for possession of <1g of hashish oil for which she had a medical prescription. She was released as part of the Viktor Bout–Brittney Griner prisoner exchange.
Stephen Hubbard	2 April 2022	Released; 21 October 2026	1663	A 73-year-old retiree and English teacher living in Ukraine with his wife, was arrested and accused of fighting as a mercenary for Ukraine and sentenced to 6.5 years in prison where he was tortured and beaten.
Ksenia Karelina	27 January 2024	Released; 10 April 2025	439	A Russian-American ballet dancer who was arrested for treason after donating $51.80 to a charity supporting Ukraine. She was released in a prisoner exchange on April 10, 2025.
Andre Khachatoorian	27 December 2021	Detained	1790	He was arrested during a layover in Moscow for illegal possession of a firearm, which was properly stowed in his luggage.
Sarah Krivanek	15 December 2021	Released; 8 December 2022	358	An English language teacher since 2017, she was attacked by her roommate and arrested for using a knife to defend herself. She was released in the Viktor Bout–Brittney Griner prisoner exchange.
Alsu Kurmasheva	18 October 2023	Released; 1 August 2024	288	A journalist working for Radio Free Europe was arrested for failing to register as a foreign agent, and later released as part of the 2024 Ankara prisoner exchange.
Michael Travis Leake	6 June 2023	Detained	1264	A former paratrooper who spent 10 years in Russia teaching English and fronting for two Russia rock bands before he was arrested on charges of drug trafficking and sentenced to 13 years in prison.
Yuri Malev	8 December 2023	Detained	1079	A U.S./Russian dual citizen, he was arrested while visiting Russia for social media posts he had made previously which were critical of the Russian invasion of Ukraine. He was charged with "rehabilitation of Nazism" and sentenced to 3.5 years in prison.
Trevor Reed	16 August 2019	Released; 27 April 2022	985	A former U.S. Marine who was detained at the request of friends while intoxicated, and later charged with assaulting police officers and espionage. After his release he traveled to fight against Russia in the Russian invasion of Ukraine.
Eugene Spector	19 February 2020	Detained	2467	A businessman whose company manufactured medical supplies, he was arrested for bribery and later charged with espionage.
Thomas Stwalley	6 July 2018	Detained	3060	Arrested for intent to distribute marijuana, sentenced to 11 years to a labor camp.
Paul Whelan	28 December 2018	Released; 1 August 2024	2043	A former U.S. Marine who was framed by a longtime friend for espionage during a trip to Moscow while visiting for a wedding. He was released as part of the 2024 Ankara prisoner exchange.
James Vincent Wilgus	7 November 2016	Detained	3666	A musician working on a motion picture soundtrack on location in Russia, he was kidnapped and forced to sign a confession for indecent exposure.
Robert Woodland	5 January 2024	Detained	1051	Adopted by U.S. parents as a child, he returned to Russia to find his birth mother and taught English while living in Russia. He was arrested on charges of drug trafficking and manufacture.

== North America ==
=== Cuba ===
Name	Detained	Status	Days in detention	Reason for detention
Alina Lopez	January 2017	Detained	~3611	A schoolteacher arrested for espionage, because her husband worked for the U.N., sentenced to 13 years in prison.

=== Turks and Caicos ===
Name	Detained	Status	Days in detention	Reason for detention
Michael Lee Evans	12 December 2023	Released; 24 April 2024	134	A 72-year-old tourist with terminal cancer visited the country to renew his vows with his wife, and was arrested while trying to return to the U.S. for possessing seven loose rounds of ammunition in his luggage. He was detained in the country and allowed to return to the U.S. due to his medical condition and after paying a $20,000 bond.
Sharitta Grier	13 May 2024	Released; 20 July 2024	68	A grandmother on a surprise vacation who was arrested trying to leave the country with two rounds of ammunition found in her luggage. She was chained to a chair in a cold, damp jail cell for a number of days and was released after a coordinated effort of U.S. media publicity and the intervention of members of the U.S. Congress.
Bryan Hagerich	14 February 2024	Released; 25 May 2024	101	A tourist arrested for possessing twenty rounds of ammunition is his luggage. He was detained in the country, along with other Americans in similar circumstances, and faced a 12-year prison setence under the country's strict firearms laws. He was released after a coordinated effort of U.S. media publicity and the intervention of members of the U.S. Congress.
Ryan Watson	12 April 2024	Released; 23 June 2024	72	A tourist arrested while trying to return to the U.S. for possessing four loose rounds of ammunition in the lining of his luggage. He was detained in the country, along with other Americans in similar circumstances, and faced a 12-year prison setence under the country's strict firearms laws. He was released after a coordinated effort of U.S. media publicity and the intervention of members of the U.S. Congress.
Tyler Wenrich	28 April 2024	Released; 28 May 2024	30	A 911 operator who was vacationing on a cruise ship which stopped in Turks and Caicos. He was arrested for possession of 2 rounds of 9mm ammunition and spent three weeks in jail and fined $9,000 before being released after a coordinated effort of U.S. media publicity and the intervention of members of the U.S. Congress.

== Oceania ==
=== New Zealand ===
Name	Detained	Status	Days in detention	Reason for detention
Ronald Wayne Cook Sr.	1 July 2016	Detained	3795	Hired as an English/Spanish translator, he was arrested in connection with a Mexican cartel-linked cocaine smuggling operation and sentenced to 17 years in prison.

== South America ==
=== Chile ===
Name	Detained	Status	Days in detention	Reason for detention
Ethan Guo	28 June 2025	Released; 11 August 2025	44	A 19-year-old social media influencer, who was flying solo to all seven continents with the goal of raising $1 million for St. Jude Children’s Research Hospital, experienced engine trouble in bad weather and made an emergency landing at a Chilean airstrip in Antarctica on June 28, 2025, where he was arrested and charged with illegally landing in Chilean territory. Guo was detained in a military base where he was confined indoors, fed meager rations, and given only limited communication with the outside world until he agreed to donate $30,000 to a Chilean cancer charity in order to secure his release.

=== Venezuela ===
Name	Detained	Status	Days in detention	Reason for detention
Airan Berry	May 2020	Released; 21 December 2023	~1,329	Former Green Beret arrested for involvement in a beach landing to overthrow the government.
Gustavo Cárdenas	21 November 2017	Released; March 9, 2022	1,569	Arrested for corruption charges and detained among the Citgo Six.
Luke Denman	May 2020	Released; 21 December 2023	~1,329	Former Green Beret arrested for involvement in a beach landing to overthrow the government.
David Estrella	9 September 2024	Released; 31 January 2025	144	A 64-year-old father of 5 from New Jersey, living part time in Ecuador and traveling to visit friends. He was detained while applying for a tourist visa and taken by Venezuelan authorities across the border from Colombia and subjected to intense physical and psychological torture. Released as part of a group of six Americans after a visit by special presidential envoy Richard Grenell to meet with Nicolas Maduro.
David Guillaume	9 September 2024	Released; 31 January 2025	144	A nurse from Florida traveling for 3 weeks with his fiancée who is a Venezuelan citizen. They were detained while applying for a tourist visa and taken by Venezuelan authorities across the border from Colombia and subjected to intense physical and psychological torture. Released as part of a group of six Americans after a visit by special presidential envoy Richard Grenell to meet with Nicolas Maduro. After his release, he returned to Colombia to be with the family of his fiancée who remains detained.
Matthew John Heath	September 2020	Released; 1 October 2022	~760	A decorated US Marine veteran, he was arrested in Colombia for arms trafficking after authorities discovered two handgun magazines. He was released but was arrested in Venezuela for arms trafficking and espionage.
Eyvin Hernandez	29 March 2022	Released; December 21, 2023	632	A Salvadoran-American lawyer working as an L.A. Public Defender, he was arrested by Venezuelan military agents near the border during a trip with a friend who was travelling to Venezuela.
Lucas Hunter	7 January 2025	Released; 18 July 2025	192	A tourist on a windsurfing trip to Colombia who was taken across the border into Venezuela after reportedly approaching an unmarked border crossing. Released with 10 other Americans in a prisoner swap.
James Luckey-Lange	9 December 2025	Released; 13 January 2026	35	Son of famous singer Diane Luckey (Q Lazzarus), he was traveling Latin America following the death of his parents, researching gold mining practices in the Amazon rainforest in Guyana. He was planning to fly out of Caracas when he was reportedly taken by Venezuelan authorities. He was later released along with other U.S. citizens on January 13, 2026.
Renzo Castillo	24 September 2024	Released; 18 July 2025	297	A Peruvian-American, he traveled to Venezuela to meet with family, and was detained and charged with terrorism and conspiring to assassinate Nicolás Maduro. He was beaten and tortured in prison before being released in a prisoner exchange.
Aidel Suarez	24 December 2024	Detained	697	A Cuban-American, and Florida resident, he travelled to Caracas for his wedding to his Venezuelan fiancée, and was detained in Güiria.
Jonathan Torres Duque	27 October 2024	Released; 1 January 2026	431	A Venezuelan Americans and son of actress Rhoda Torres, he was arrested in Venezuela and accused of being an American spy. He was later released along with at least 80 other prisoners on January 1, 2026.
Wilbert Joseph Castaneda	31 August 2024	Released; 18 July 2025	321	A U.S. Navy SEAL who was traveling with friends as a tourist, he was arrested with other U.S. citizens and accused of being involved in a plot to assassinate Venezuelan president Nicolás Maduro. Released with 10 other Americans in a prisoner swap.
Jose Angel Pereira	21 November 2017	Released; March 9, 2022	1,569	Arrested for corruption charges and detained among the Citgo Six.
Joseph St. Clair	17 November 2024	Released; May 20, 2025	184	An Air Force veteran, who served four tours in Afghanistan, was traveling in the region in relation to PTSD treatment. After vanishing for several months it was revealed in February 2025 that Joseph was wrongfully detained in Venezuela.
Jorge Toledo	21 November 2017	Released; March 9, 2022	1,569	Arrested for corruption charges and detained among the Citgo Six.
Tomeu Vadell	21 November 2017	Released; March 9, 2022	1,569	Arrested for corruption charges and detained among the Citgo Six.
Gregory Werber	19 September 2024	Released; 31 January 2025	134	A 62-year-old software developer on a backpacking and hiking trip. He was detained at an airport, along with his Venezuelan girlfriend, and taken to Caracas where he was subjected to intense physical and psychological torture. Released as part of a group of six Americans after a visit by special presidential envoy Richard Grenell to meet with Nicolas Maduro.
Alirio Zambrano	21 November 2017	Released; March 9, 2022	1,569	Arrested for corruption charges and detained among the Citgo Six.
Jose Luis Zambrano	21 November 2017	Released; March 9, 2022	1,569	Arrested for corruption charges and detained among the Citgo Six.

== See also ==
- U.S. Hostage and Wrongful Detainee Day
- List of imprisoned, detained and missing journalists
- Disappearance of Robert Levinson in 2007 while he was on a mission in Iran for the Central Intelligence Agency; thought to have been held prisoner by the government of Iran and presumed dead
