= 2014 hostage rescue operations in Yemen =

US-Yemeni operations against al-Qaeda

- Part of the al-Qaeda insurgency in Yemen and the war on terror
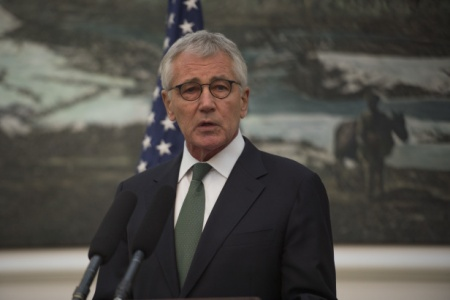
- United States Secretary of Defense Chuck Hagel at a press conference after the second rescue attempt.
Date	First attempt: 25 November 2014; Second attempt: 6 December 2014
Location	Yemen: Hajr as-Say'ar District, Hadhramaut Governorate (first raid); Dafaar, Nisab District, Shabwah Governorate (second raid)
Result	First attempt: Mission successful; Eight hostages freed; Somers and four other hostages moved to different location; Second attempt: Mission failure; Luke Somers and Pierre Korkie killed; Other three hostages unfound

Belligerents
United States; Yemen	al-Qaeda in the Arabian Peninsula

Commanders and leaders
(United States) Barack Obama (United States) Chuck Hagel (United States) Raymond A. Thomas (Yemen) Abdrabbuh Mansur Hadi (Yemen) Ali Hasan al-Ahmadi	Jamal Mubarak al-Hard al-Daghari al-Awlaki †

Strength
First raid: United States: Two dozen DEVGRU operators; MH-60 helicopters flown by 160th Night Stalkers; Yemen: Small group of special forces; Second raid: United States: 40 DEVGRU operators; 2 V-22 Osprey tiltrotors; Yemen: Small number of Yemeni soldiers	7 AQAP guards (first raid) 6 AQAP guards (second raid)

Casualties and losses
1 Yemeni soldier wounded (first raid)	13 killed (7 in first raid, 6 in second raid)
- 2 hostages killed 8 Yemeni civilians killed

In late 2014, the United States and Yemen conducted a series of military operations to rescue multiple hostages held by al-Qaeda in the Arabian Peninsula (AQAP). U.S. involvement in the missions were primarily motivated by the captivity of American journalist Luke Somers, who was kidnapped by AQAP in 2013. The first raid, attempted on 25 November 2014, involved American and Yemeni special forces assaulting a cave in Hadhramaut governorate housing the hostages, killing seven AQAP fighters in the process. The raid rescued eight hostages of various nationalities, but they did not include Somers or South African teacher Pierre Korkie, who were moved to another area alongside three other hostages prior to the raid.

Later in December, AQAP released a video threatening to kill Somers within three days, prompting another rescue mission on 6 December 2014 in Shabwah governorate. Navy SEALs attempted to infiltrate the AQAP compound containing the hostages, but they were prematurely spotted by the guards, leading to a firefight. Upon entering the compound, Somers and Korkie were found shot, while the other hostages were missing. Both Somers and Korkie died while being transported to receive care.

Somers' death, occurring five months after the failed rescue attempt of James Foley, resulted in scrutiny over the United States' hostage policy, which restricts any official government negotiations or ransom considerations. Additional controversy was directed at the fact that Korkie was set to be released by AQAP one day after the raid as a result of civilian negotiations with the group. No other U.S.-led ground operation in Yemen would be officially acknowledged by the American government until 2017.

== Background ==
Kidnapping has been a tactic used by groups in Yemen since the 1990s in order to receive concessions from the Yemeni government or the hostages' nation. Yemeni tribesmen have often used kidnappings as a bargaining chip to force the government to improve their living standards and local infrastructure, as well as to release imprisoned members of their tribe. Kidnappings in Yemen have rarely resulted in the harming or murder of the hostage.

Formed in 2009, al-Qaeda in the Arabian Peninsula has often used foreigner kidnappings for monetary gain, demanding ransoms for their hostages in order to fund their activities. The group particularly targets foreigners from European states due to their willingness to secure their citizens at all costs, allowing for AQAP to secure multi-million dollar payouts in some cases. In contrast, South Africa and the United States have a hardline policy of not paying ransoms. Ransoming foreigners constitutes a significant portion of AQAP's income, with the group amassing a reported $30 million from kidnappings between 2011 and 2013. Yemeni officials stated in early 2014 that around 30 percent of kidnappings in the country were perpetrated by AQAP. In contrast to the Islamic State, AQAP had never murdered their foreign hostages prior to the rescue missions, instead boasting about their superior treatment of captives and condemning ISIL's beheadings.

Since 2009, the United States government has been leading a counterterrorism campaign against AQAP, targeting the group in order to reduce its ability to attack American targets. The primary component of this campaign has been the usage of drone strikes for targeted killings against the groups leaders, though the U.S. has also sent special forces units in non-combat roles to train Yemeni soldiers. In 2011, amid the chaos of the Yemeni revolution, AQAP seized pockets of territory in southern Yemen. In response, the United States launched an unprecedented amount of drone strikes against the group in 2012 and sent additional ground forces to train Yemeni soldiers participating in the military offensive to reclaim the lost territory.

== Hostages ==
Nationalities and status of the hostages
Country	Number	Status
United States	1	Killed
Yemen	7	6 rescued, 1 unknown
Saudi Arabia	1	Rescued
Ethiopia	1	Rescued
South Africa	1	Killed
United Kingdom	1	Unknown
Turkey	1	Unknown
Total	13	8 rescued, 2 killed, 3 unknown

=== Kidnappings and negotiations ===
Luke Somers, a British-born American citizen and freelance journalist who worked for multiple local news agencies such as the Yemen Times and the National Yemen, was kidnapped by AQAP gunmen while exiting a Sana'a supermarket in September 2013. The American government imposed a media blackout on reports about Somers for the next years, with local news outlets being the ones to initially report his kidnapping. Somers' family was advised by the FBI not to publicly acknowledge his captivity. According to The Intercept, negotiations for the release of Somers were done between AQAP and a mediator, with the talks going as to discuss the ransom price until April 2014, when the United States ceased all discussions and rejected any more mediation from tribal leaders. The group reportedly had no plans of killing Somers prior to the first rescue attempt.

Pierre Korkie, a South African teacher who had been working in Yemen for four year, was kidnapped by AQAP alongside his wife Yolande Korkie outside a hotel in Ta'iz in May 2013. Negotiations between AQAP and South African charity Gift of the Givers lead to the release of Yolande on 10 January 2014 without any payment, though the group still demanded $3 million for the release of Pierre. After a prolonged silence, in August 2014 a tribal delegation representing the charity convinced AQAP to lower the ransom price of Korkie to $700,000, which they did in October 2014. In November 2014, the tribal mediators were killed in a drone strike while travelling to meet with AQAP again. On 26 November 2014, AQAP decided to lower the ransom price to $200,000, which they promised to use in order to reimburse the families of the dead tribesmen. Korkie's release was scheduled to be on 7 December, with him being flown out of Yemen under diplomatic cover to a safe nation to meet his family before being transported to South Africa. On 6 December, the same day as the second rescue attempt, tribal leaders in Aden hosted a meeting to prepare for Korkie's release and reunion with his wife and children. Gift of the Givers was warned by their AQAP contacts to keep the negotiations confidential, neither sharing their developments with the South African government or the United States. An exception to this were Yemeni authorities supervising the negotiations, though its uncertain whether or not they shared their information with the U.S. government.

== First raid ==
=== Preparation ===
According to a Yemeni special forces soldier present in the raid, the operation was conceived after Yemeni intelligence identified AQAP members transporting 11 enchained hostages covered in blankets via pickup trucks. The hostages were driven to a cave which was about 10 meters deep and 30 meters wide, and 109 km away from the hamlet of Hajr as-Say'ar in Hadhramaut. The mission was organized within two weeks after Yemeni President Abdrabbuh Mansur Hadi contacted the United States government for support in the operation. Hadi may have authorized the mission in an attempt to improve his image and relationship with the United States amid the Houthi takeover of Sana'a just months earlier.

=== Raid ===
During the pre-dawn hours of 25 November 2014, a team of thirty soldiers composed of about two dozen U.S. Navy SEALs from DEVGRU leading a small group of Yemeni special forces flew via helicopters into Hajr as-Say'ar district. Dividing into four groups, the soldiers travelled 7 km through the mountainous area until reaching the cave, an AQAP shelter containing the hostages. One group of SEALs, equipped with night-vision goggles, opened fire on seven AQAP fighters, 100 yards away from the entrance of the cave, who were caught by surprise from the nighttime assault. After the firefight ended with all seven AQAP guards dead, the SEALs entered the cave and found eight imprisoned hostages, them being six Yemenis, one Saudi Arabian and one Ethiopian, along with AQAP cellphones and documents. The SEALs were extracted with the hostages via MH-60 helicopters piloted by 160th Night Stalkers personnel. The hostages inside the cave informed them that five other hostages, including Somers and Korkie along with a Brit, a Yemeni and a Turk, were moved two days prior to the mission. No American forces were injured in the mission, though one Yemeni soldier was lightly wounded.

== Second raid ==
=== AQAP threat ===
On 4 December 2014, AQAP released a video threatening to execute Somers within three days if the American government failed to meet unspecified demands. The three-minute video depicts AQAP commander and cleric Nasser bin Ali al-Ansi describing in Arabic various "crimes" that U.S. counterterrorism has inflicted upon the people of Yemen, Iraq, Somalia and Pakistan. It then shows a 30-second English statement by Somers pleading for help. Al-Ansi criticizes the U.S. government for their "failed operation" in Hadhramaut which killed seven of their "elite group of mujahedeen," warning the United States against conducting any other "foolish action." Analysts noted the three-day deadline and open threat against a foreign hostage as unusually hostile for AQAP. The same day, Pentagon Press Secretary John Kirby officially acknowledged the United States' involvement in the raid in November as well as their inability to retrieve Somers. Somers' family also broke their silence on the kidnapping, uploading a video on YouTube pleading AQAP to release Somers and spare him punishment for the rescue attempt, which they said they were not aware of.

=== Preparation ===
On 5 December, U.S. President Barack Obama and Secretary of Defense Chuck Hagel determined that Somers' life was in "imminent danger" and that the government had enough intelligence on the location of the hostages to conduct another raid to free the captives. The raid was approved mid-morning on December 5. The U.S. government was aware of another hostage being held with Somers, but they did not know that it was Korkie or that prior negotiations had his release set to be December 7.

=== Raid ===
Location of Dafaar in Yemen.

On 6 December 2014 at approximately 1:00 a.m. AST (UTC+3), a group of forty DEVGRU soldiers were transported in two V-22 Ospreys from the USS Makin Island to the Wadi Abadan in Nisab District, Shabwah, about 10 km from the compound where Luke Somers and Pierre Korkie were being housed. Despite U.S. officials stating that only their forces were present in the raid, the Yemeni government and local residents reported Yemeni soldiers participating in the operation. The compound was a house belonging to suspected AQAP member Saeed al-Daghari in Dafaar, a remote, mountainous village that had 20-40 homes within it. The compound was being guarded by about half a dozen AQAP gunmen. After hiking to Dafaar, while the SEALs were about 100 yards away from the site, an AQAP member relieving himself outside or a barking dog may have alerted the guards, leading to a firefight that lasted for about 10 minutes. Tribal leader Tarek al-Daghari al-Awlaki stated that DEVGRU soldiers raided four houses in the area during the operation, killing an AQAP commander identified as Jamal Mubarak al-Hard al-Daghari al-Awlaki along with two other AQAP members, as well as eight civilians including a woman, a 10-year-old boy and a 70-year-old man. Once the SEALs killed the militants and entered the compound they found Somers and Korkie with several gunshot wounds, possibly inflicted by an AQAP guard who ran into the house shortly after being alerted to the DEVGRU raid before returning to the firefight. American medical personnel treated the wounded hostages on the ground before they left on Ospreys to the USS Makin Island for further treatment. Korkie died while being operated on during the flight and Somers died while undergoing surgery abroad the vessel. The entire operation took 30 minutes, with American forces killing six AQAP fighters and suffering zero losses.

== Reactions ==
=== Government ===
In a written statement released after the second raid, Barack Obama offered condolences to the families of Somers and Korkie and condemned their execution by AQAP, labeling it a "barbaric murder". He reaffirmed the United States' counterterrorism and hostage rescue policy and the American government's opposition to negotiating with terrorists. While on a visit to Afghanistan, Chuck Hagel praised the operation as "extremely well-executed" while acknowledging its risk. He defended the decision to go through with the rescue mission as there were "compelling reasons to believe Somers' life was in imminent danger." U.S. Secretary of State John Kerry said that the execution of Somers and Korkie was “a reminder of the brutality of the terrorists.” On 8 December 2014, while delivering a speech at the 2014 Saban Forum in Washington, U.S. Vice President Joe Biden offered condolences to the family of Somers while praising U.S. Special Forces for their "incredible job" and the Yemeni government for their cooperation. The same day, White House Press Secretary Josh Earnest said to reporters that Obama "does not regret at all" his decision to authorize the mission to rescue Somers, citing AQAP's intent to execute Somers by the day of the raid. Chuck Hagel later stated that the U.S. would not review their hostage rescue policy, describing it as "about as thorough as there can be" despite mentioning its risk and "imperfection."

South Africa's Department of International Relations and Cooperation issued a statement expressing their "deepest condolences" to the families of the victims, announcing that Korkie's body would be returned to South Africa by December 8. At a press conference in Pretoria, Foreign Minister Maite Nkoana-Mashabane defended the United States' attempt to free the hostages, stating that "the intentions were good, but the result was not what we wanted." Shadow foreign minister of the Democratic Alliance party Stevens Mokgalapa called upon the South African government to “urgently engage with American representatives to get to the bottom of the circumstances that led to Mr. Korkie’s death.”

=== Mediators and victim families ===
Gift of the Givers founder Dr. Imtiaz Sooliman was notified of Korkie's death the same day as the rescue mission at 8:03 a.m. SAST (UTC+2), only two hours after he had promised Yolande Korkie that she would see her husband the next day. The organization released a statement shortly after the raid, sending their condolences to the Korkie family and describing the process by which he would have been released, stating that "The psychological and emotional devastation to Yolande and her family will be compounded by the knowledge that Pierre was to be released by al-Qaeda tomorrow." Anas Hamati, Gift of the Givers’ project director for Yemen stated that the U.S.' raid had "destroyed everything." Speaking on the rescue attempt, Sooliman said that he was not upset with the United States or their operation as they were acting in the interest of their people and likely did not know that Korkie was present with Somers.

Hours after his death, Yolande Korkie sent a message to Sooliman writing:

“We are devastated but I also know you all are devastated. You said in your media statement you salute me, but I wish to return this salute to you and Anas [Hamati,] and the tribes. Please accept our deep appreciation for your immeasurable commitment, as well as to Anas and the tribes. I am too emotional to speak to Anas right now. But remind him of my words to him in Sana’a: if anything happens, it is NOT his fault. And neither your or the tribes’ fault. We will speak soon, Yolande, Pieter-ben and Lize-mari.”

In a press conference on 9 December 2014, Yolande Korkie said that she had forgiven her husbands captors rather than hold onto spite, thanking the United States for bringing Pierre Korkie's remains to their home and Gift of the Givers for their attempts to free him."

Somers' half-sister and stepmother told British newspaper The Times that they were angered with the U.S.'s rescue attempt, blaming it for the death of Somers. They maintain that Somers would have preferred that negotiations continued rather than a rescue mission be executed, and voiced skepticism that Somers would actually be executed by AQAP's deadline, saying that there had been "threats before that had not been carried out." In an article from The Guardian published on 25 June 2015, Paula and Jordan Somers, Luke Somers' mother and brother, detail their lack of communication and connection with the U.S. government throughout Somers' time in captivity, Paula stating that she blames the U.S. for Somers' death rather than AQAP.

=== AQAP ===
On 12 December 2014, AQAP released a video through their al-Malahem Media Foundation in which they blamed Obama for making the "wrong decision", stating that the American government ignoring negotiations and proceeding with the rescue mission lead to Somers' death.

After the death of incarcerated al-Jama'a al-Islamiyya leader sheikh Omar Abdel-Rahman on 6 March 2017, AQAP released a statement the same day in which leader Qasim al-Raymi claimed that their "only demand" for the release of Somers was the freedom of Abdel-Rahman and alleged al-Qaeda associate Aafia Siddiqui. He said that the group had proposed a prisoner exchange with the United States but were rejected.

== Aftermath ==
=== U.S. hostage policy ===
In December 2014, the U.S. government began an internal review of their hostage policy. Led by Homeland Security Advisor Lisa Monaco and Lieutenant General Bennet Sacolick, the initiative focused on streamlining and improving communications with the families of hostages, consulting over a hundred U.S. officials, five foreign governments and 24 hostage families, inducing the family of Luke Somers. Common complaints from the families included inconsistent interactions between them and federal officials, distribution of confusing and contradictory information from the government and anger in part due to threats of criminal charges if they considered paying ransoms. On 24 June 2015, President Obama announced that the review had been concluded and several new policies had been put in place for hostage situations, including official permission for the U.S. government to communicate and negotiate with hostage takers. Other introductions included the permission of hostage families to negotiate and pay ransoms to free captives without facing prosecution and the establishment of a dedicated Hostage Recovery Fusion Cell to streamline and improve communications between families and the government. Obama reiterated that the government's policy to not pay ransoms to kidnappers would remain.

=== U.S. activities in Yemen ===
The remaining 125 U.S. special forces soldiers advising the Yemeni military were withdrawn in March 2015 amid the collapse of the Hadi government and the Houthi takeover of power. The withdrawal coincided with a Saudi-led coalition announcing their entry in the Yemeni civil war, backed in support by the United States. The lack of U.S. ground presence and intelligence-gathering in Yemen allowed for AQAP to significantly expand their power during the civil war, capturing swathes of territory in the south of the country during the year, though drone strikes still continued to target the group. Small numbers of U.S. special forces began being deployed again in 2016 in support of Yemeni and coalition efforts to combat AQAP, though they maintained "intelligence support" rather than direct participation. Only with the arrival of the Trump administration in 2017 did U.S.-led ground operations in Yemen resume, beginning with the raid on Yakla.

== See also ==
- List of journalists killed in Yemen
- 2014 American rescue mission in Syria
