= Luke Somers =

American photojournalist (1981–2014)

- Born: Luke Daniel Somers; 1981; London, England
- Died: December 6, 2014 (aged 33); USS Makin Island, off Yemen
- Cause of death: Complications from gunshot wounds
- Education: Beloit College (2008)
- Occupation: Photojournalist

Luke Daniel Somers (29 August 1981 – 6 December 2014) was a British-born American photojournalist who had been held hostage by the militant Islamist group al-Qaeda in the Arabian Peninsula (AQAP) in Yemen. He was a dual citizen of the United Kingdom and the United States. He traveled to Egypt before settling in Yemen.

Somers was described by his friend as "a great man with a kind heart who really loves the Yemeni people and the country ... He was so dedicated in trying to help change Yemen's future, to do good things for the people that he didn't leave the country [Yemen] his entire time here."

== Early life and education ==
Somers was born in London, England, but grew up in Sacramento, California and Renton, Washington. He graduated from Beloit College in Wisconsin with a bachelor's degree in creative writing in 2008, and later traveled to Egypt before settling in Yemen.

== Career ==
Somers worked as a freelance journalist. His pictures were featured in the BBC and Al Jazeera. He was a freelance photographer for the Yemen Times.

His work was featured at the 2016 Yemeni Film & Arts Festival in New York. They were part of an exhibit at New York University's Kevorkian Center in Manhattan.

His work was shown on April 15–17, 2016 at the Friends Meeting of Washington, DC. His work can be found on his Corbis and Demotix pages.

== Kidnapping ==
Somers was kidnapped by Al Qaeda in Sana'a, the capital of Yemen, in September 2013.

In December 2014, Somers appeared in a video that was issued by AQAP. The video, which is aimed at the United States government, includes an AQAP official saying that the United States has three days to meet their demands. In the video, the official also says that "otherwise the American hostage held by us will meet his inevitable fate." The video does not specify the demands AQAP want the United States to meet. The mission to rescue Somers was disclosed in response to the release of the video by AQAP.

Somers' mother and brother posted a video online in response to the AQAP's video. In the video, they pleaded with AQAP to "show mercy," and appealed for Somers' release. They also said Somers was only "trying to do good things for the Yemeni population."

Numerous news organizations, friends around the world, and family mobilized to save Somers. Yemen's The National newspaper appealed to save Somers' life, as did the Committee to Protect Journalists. Friends of Luke Somers also organized petitions, vigils, Twitter pages, and Facebook groups to gather support for his safe release.

== First rescue attempt ==
After being authorized to do so by President of the United States Barack Obama, the Pentagon launched a secret mission to attempt to rescue Somers in November 2014, but the mission was unsuccessful. On December 4, they disclosed the fact that this mission had occurred.

The mission, an assault on a cave in remote Hagr As Sai'ar District in Hadhramaut Governorate, was successful in freeing six Yemenis, an Ethiopian and a Saudi, but none of the Western hostages, including Somers, were found.

Details surrounding the mission remain classified as of December 4, 2014. It is believed that Somers had been moved from the hostage site before the special operators in the mission arrived there. Previous intelligence indicated that some hostages had been moved several days earlier, but it was not then known if Somers was among them.

== Death ==
On December 4, 2014, Al-Qaeda in the Arabian Peninsula (AQAP) threatened to execute Somers within three days if the US government failed to meet unspecified demands.

On December 6, 2014, about 40 US special operations forces were involved in the attempt to rescue Luke Somers and Pierre Korkie, a South African teacher also held by al-Qaeda militants in Yemen, which followed US drone strikes in the area. The rescuers, backed by Yemeni ground forces, advanced within 100 meters of the compound in Shabwah Governorate when they were spotted by the militants. A firefight ensued. When the American soldiers finally entered the building where Somers and Korkie were kept, they found both men alive, but gravely wounded with several gunshot wounds, possibly inflicted by an AQAP guard who ran into the house shortly after being alerted to the DEVGRU raid before returning to the firefight. The US forces pulled Somers and Korkie onto V-22 Ospreys, and medical teams began performing surgery in midair. Korkie died during the flight and Somers died after the Ospreys landed on the USS Makin Island.

Information "indicated that Luke's life was in imminent danger," said US President Barack Obama. "Based on this assessment, and as soon as there was reliable intelligence and an operational plan, I authorized a rescue attempt." He condemned the "barbaric murder" of Somers. "The callous disregard for Luke's life is more proof of the depths of AQAP's depravity, and further reason why the world must never cease in seeking to defeat their evil ideology," Obama said in a statement.

== See also ==
- List of journalists killed in Yemen
- List of solved missing person cases (post-2000)
