= Min Zin =

American researcher

Min Zin is an American researcher and founder of the Institute for Strategy and Policy-Myanmar. Zin has been detained by Chinese security services since June 3, 2026.

== Early life and education ==
Zin was born in Myanmar. He was a student student activist in the country's pro-democracy movement, and subsequently immigrated to the United States. He received his PhD from the University of California, Berkeley.

== Career ==
In 2026, Zin was invited by the Chinese government to participate in an academic conference in Yunnan province. An expert in China's role in the Myanmar civil war, Zin was subsequently detained for "suspected of spying and endangering Chinese national security".

The United States Department of State designated Zin as wrongfully detained, which China denies. In September 2026, Zin's wife, Sylvia, testified about him in front of the United States House Foreign Affairs Subcommittee on East Asia and the Pacific and called for his release.

== See also ==
- Exit bans in China
- List of Americans wrongfully imprisoned or detained abroad
