= Stephen Hubbard =

American retired teacher

Hubbard after being released in 2026

Stephen James Hubbard (born 17 December 1952) is an American retired English language teacher and U.S. military veteran from Big Rapids, Michigan, who was detained by Russian forces during the 2022 Russian invasion of Ukraine. In October 2024, he was sentenced by a Moscow court to six years and ten months in prison on charges of acting as a mercenary. He was released on October 21, 2026.

== Early life and career ==
Hubbard grew up in Big Rapids, Michigan, and served in the United States Air Force and the National Guard.

Having earned a master’s degree in English, he lived and worked for approximately 25 years in Japan. After living in Cyprus for a time he settled in the city of Izium with a Ukrainian partner.

== Capture and trial ==
Following the 2022 Russian invasion of Ukraine, Izium came under attack in March and was subsequently occupied by Russian military forces in April. Hubbard, then aged 69, was detained by Russian troops in April 2022.

Hubbard's case came to light when a closed door trial began in Moscow City Court. Russian state media said Hubbard had been detained while manning a Ukrainian military checkpoint but independent sources could not verify this. It was also reported that Hubbard had pleaded guilty to the charges.

On October 7, 2024, the court found Hubbard guilty under Article 359 of the Russian Criminal Code (participating as a mercenary in an armed conflict) and sentenced him to six years and 10 months in a penal colony. Following his conviction, he was moved across multiple detention facilities, spending time incarcerated in the Mordovia region.

Russian state media accused Hubbard of fighting in Izium after signing a contract of $1,000 per month. However, his sister Patricia Hubbard Fox denied these accusations, dismissing it as a lie.

== Reactions and diplomatic status ==
Hubbard's family has rejected the mercenary accusations, emphasizing his advanced age, historical background as an educator, and his pro-Russian views.

In January 2025, the United States government officially designated Hubbard as wrongfully detained, empowering the Special Presidential Envoy for Hostage Affairs to negotiate for his release.

President Trump meeting with Hubbard in the Oval Office after his 2026 release

On October 20, 2026, US president Donald Trump stated he had requested Russian president Vladimir Putin to release Hubbard. The following day, the BBC reported that Putin had said Russia had agreed to release Hubbard following talks with Steve Witkoff in Saint Petersburg. Trump's partial lifting of sanctions against Moscow – including a deal to purchase sanctioned Russian diesel – coincided with Hubbard's release.

== See also ==
- List of American people imprisoned in Russia
