= Hajar Am-Dhaybiyya =

Archaeological site in Yemen

Hajar Am-Dhaybiyya (Arabic: هجر امذيبية) is an ancient Arabian archaeological settlement that date back to the kingdom of Hadramawt in Nisab district of Shabwah Governorate in Yemen. The site necropolis (100 m large) revealed elaborate and extraordinary burial objects. Though the findings were concentrated in a small portion of the general area. Four burials only were excavated.

== The site ==
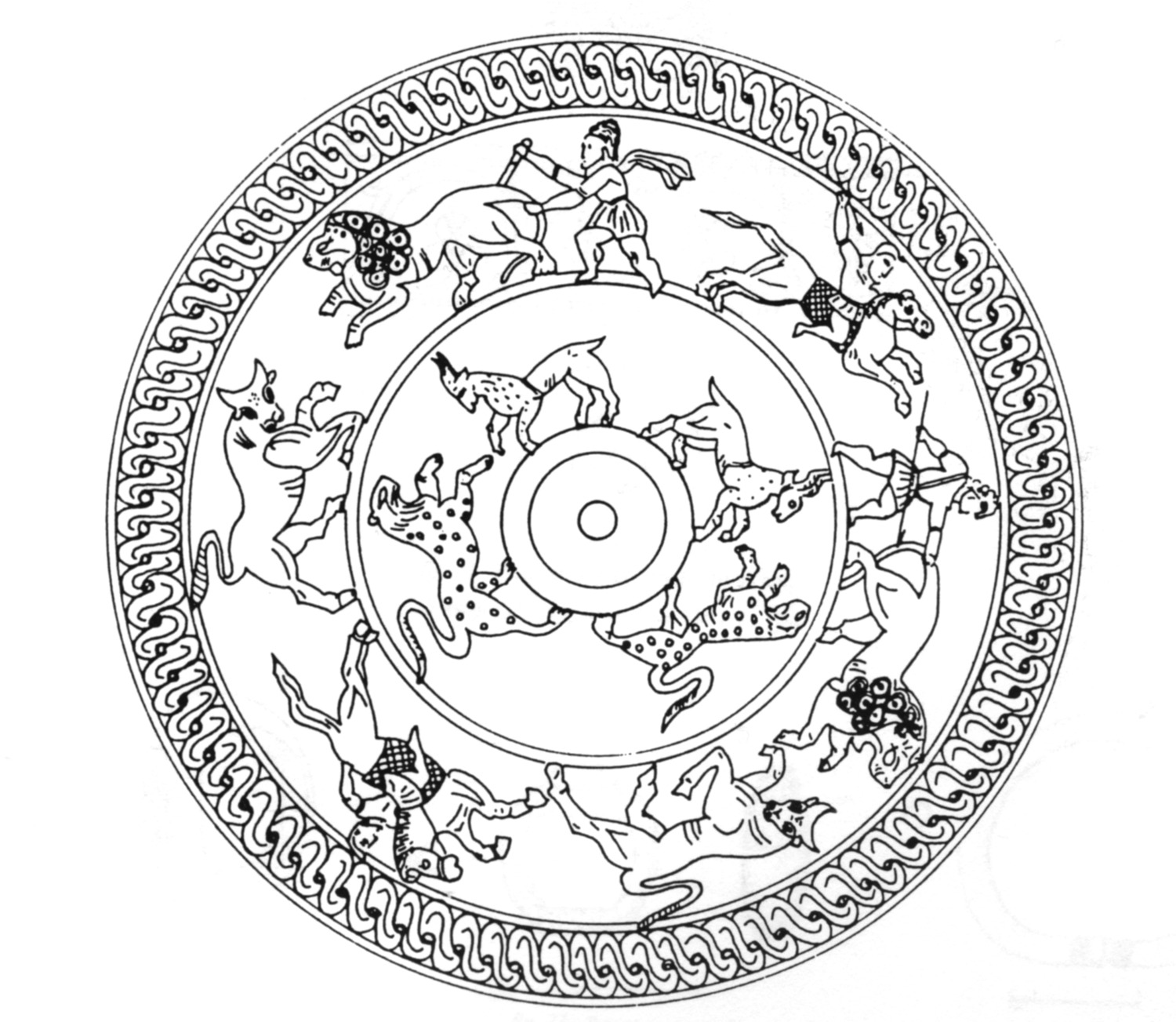
Silver ladle found in one of the burials

The city sequence is divided into 5 phases based on major changes of the site architecture. The initial phase on the hill top is usually dated to first centuries AD and was dominated by a single building constructed using characteristic technique of pre-Islamic south Arabia. Only one room in the structure with preserved floor exist. It appears, from the fill beneath the plaster floor, that at one point, the building was renewed. Glacis (4–6 m wide) was also constructed on the site, however whether it encircle the entire tell is not clear.

Judging from the surface layers of the necropolis, the tombs appear to span over several centuries. Grave 3 is dated approximately between 1st to 4th century AD. And the artifacts found there shows detectable Roman artistic influence.

Four burials had been excavated in the site necropolis, only grave 3 was intact, and it yielded great amount of funerary possessions. Which apparently belonged to either an upper class individual, or rather a soldier as suggested by the presence of weapons.

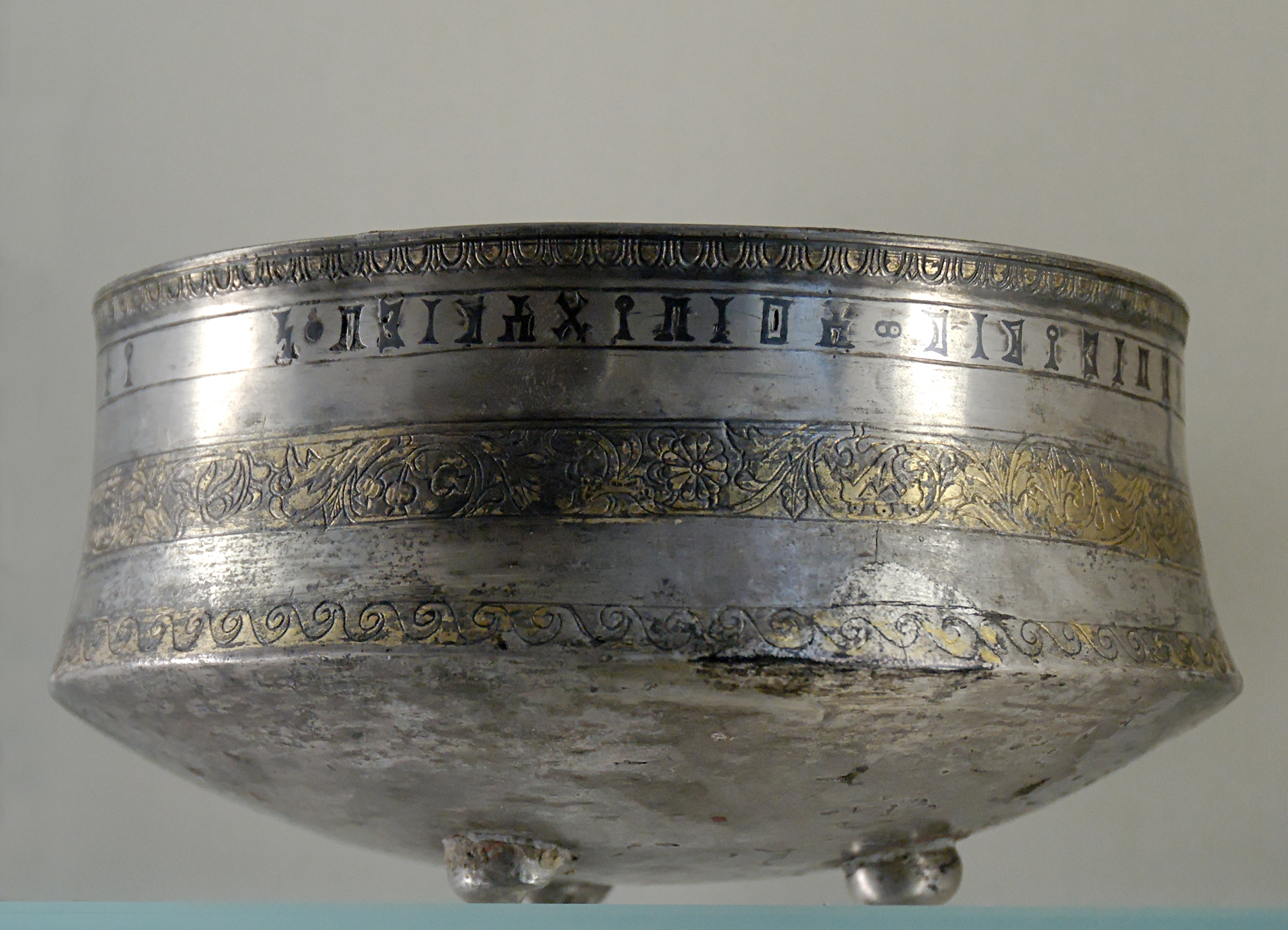
Tripodic cup found in tomb 2. Partly gilt and nielloed silver. 2nd-3rd centuries AD
