= Anti-Fascist Internationalist Front =

Internationalist group fighting against the military junta in Myanmar

- Burmese: ဖက်ဆစ်ဆန့်ကျင်ရေး နိုင်ငံတကာတပ်ဦး
- Flag of the AIF
- Dates active: 15 October 2024 – present
- Country: Myanmar
- Active regions: Chin State; Magway Region; Sagaing Region
- Ideology: Internationalism; Anti-fascism; Anti-capitalism
- Size: ~15–40
- Wars: Myanmar conflict and Myanmar civil war (2021–present)
- Website: https://aifmyanmar.noblogs.org/

The Anti-Fascist Internationalist Front (AIF) is an armed Internationalist formation in Myanmar, composed of foreign volunteers participating in the ongoing civil war. While foreign fighters have been observed in Myanmar prior to the foundation of the AIF, the first mention of the group came on 15 October 2024, when the group announced its formation and called on volunteers to join the conflict. The AIF are said to be motivated by anti-fascist internationalism, viewing the conflict as part of a global battle against fascism. The AIF stated that its main aim was to support people in Myanmar opposed to the Junta government and to take part in the country’s anti-junta resistance.

The group initially developed from internationalists who were already in Myanmar and involved in both political and military activity. The AIF subsequently formalized and expanded it's presence, as additional fighters arrived to participate in the fighting. Members of the AIF claim to have provided training to local resistance organizations, as well as having participated in battles against the State Administration Council. According to the AIF, they are not permanently affiliated with any faction in the Myanmar Civil War and oppose resorting to violence in internal issues among anti-junta forces.

== Battles ==
=== Battle of Tedim ===
Formed in 15 October 2024 in the Falam countryside, the first major fighting involving the AIF was that of the Battle of Tedim. The battle for Tedim originated prior to the formation of the AIF, raging since the beginning of 11 p.m. 26–27 May 2024, when PDF-Zoland and CNDF attacked junta positions in Tedim and captured two posts. Since then, by 13 June 2024, Tedim was still split/contested, with neither the junta nor resistance forces fully controlling the town. For the Tedim, the new AIF formation would work closely with PDF-Zoland. A Hi Burma profile of a PDF-Zoland fighter operating in the Tedim area says the new AIF formation had trained PDF-Zoland and CNDF personnel.

=== Khaikam Road Operation ===
In May 2025, the SAC sent a convoy from Kalay toward northern Chin State through Khaikam and toward Taingen/သိုင်းငင်း, a key junction where the road splits toward Tedim and Falam. Local reporting said the column had about 200 troops and 15 vehicles, and that after passing Khaikam the junta blocked the road at the Khaikam police checkpoint so civilian traffic could not follow it westward. Resistance forces responded by closing the Kalay–Taingen road from 20 May 2025. Villages along the road began fleeing because of the junta column and aircraft activity, while Chinland Defense Force–Civic Defense Militia Siyin (CDF-CDM Siyin) announced the road closure for security reasons.

On 21 May 2025, fighting broke out around 10:00 a.m., near Mualpi after Chin resistance forces attacked the junta column; a resistance source said the clash was somewhere between the Shukhinthar viewpoint and Mualpi, with reinforcements arriving and artillery still being heard. According to an AIF member, those involving in the operation was the AIF, the Chin National Army (CNA) and CDF-CDM Siyin in the defense of Mualpi. By mid-June, the convoy still had not reached Taingen. A later Myanmar Mission New York summary, citing Myanmar Now and Chin Brotherhood spokesperson Salai Yaw Mang, said the convoy had entered Chin State through Khaikam, was positioned around Mualpi, and resistance forces were trying to stop it from reaching Taingen, as from Taingen it could advance toward either Tedim or Falam. After the clashes, on 5 July 2025 Chin joint defense forces captured the junta position/camp at Mualpi. The junta troops withdrew back toward Kalay.

During the Battle of Falam and the subsequent Khaikam Road Operation, the AIF destroyed multiple SAC targets; claiming one drone jammer destroyed, one commander killed, two SAC soldiers killed, and three SAC soldiers wounded. Khaikam specifically, a spokesperson would claim "dozens of casualties" inflicted.

=== Others ===
In December 2025, the AIF released a compilation of combat footage featuring FPV drones, one of the first examples of their implementation in the conflict. The video displayed the AIFs participation in the defense against the Tatmadaw's pre-election offensive in Chin State and Sagaing Region. Some reports mistranslated references to the introduction of drone warfare in the Myanmar conflict, incorrectly suggesting that the AIF had received knowledge or support from the Ukrainian government. The AIF later clarified that this was an error.

The AIF has made statements in solidarity with the revolution in North Eastern Syria, which received a reply from the Women's Protection Units. Some AIF volunteers had prior experience fighting in the Rojava conflict.

== Structure ==
While there is little official information about the structure and operation of the AIF, media channels of the group and its members suggest that the AIF is a mix of foreign volunteers working alongside individuals that it trains from local militias such as the Chin National Defence Force and PDF Zoland. The AIF has notably included women fighters in their ranks. The AIF also trains local women and requires at least equal participation by women in the specialist courses it provides. Although it is reported that local commanders of other groups resist the action. The AIF also established connections with the Spring Revolution Alliance, a coalition of 19 smaller armed groups established in December 2025. The AIF stated that it planned to expand its training activities through such connections and support the creation of additional formations similar to WITCH.

On 8 March 2025, the group issued a statement for International Women's Day, displaying their own flag as well as a KCK-inspired "Antifascist International" flag. The statement clarified the group's position as anti-capitalist.

Additionally, fighters have been shown wearing anarchist insignia, such as anarchist communist patches on their equipment. An AIF spokesperson described the group as anti-capitalist and anti-fascist, while noting that its members came from a range of political traditions, including anarchism, anti-authoritarian communism, Apoism and other currents. The spokesperson also argued that Myanmar’s revolution was broader than any single ideology, citing the country’s ethnic diversity and the role of communities seeking to build a pluralistic society with respect for Indigenous autonomy. The AIF enforced that internationalists in Myanmar were acting in solidarity with a movement led by local communities, rather than seeking to impose their own political beliefs.

=== Women Internationalists of the Chin Hills ===
AIF WITCH patch

The Women Internationalists of the Chin Hills (Burmese: စုန်းမအဖွဲ့, lit. 'Witch Group'; abbreviated as WITCH) is an autonomous women's formation affiliated within the Anti-Fascist Internationalist Front with its own flag. The word 'Witch' in the Burmese language is a negative term used to oppress women who "lived close to nature and had knowledge and power in various ways" to control them. The AIF reclaims the word under the formation of the unit to combat military brutality inflicted against the women in Myanmar and to highlight the role of women in the struggle. Although WITCH’s membership numbers are unknown, its members have come from across Myanmar and from overseas, including the United States. The unit held three fundamental principles: women's liberation by creating their own destiny, an ecologically-based organization in harmony with nature, and an equal and free society.

The group specializes in drone warfare with members of explosives technicians and reconnaissance personnel in various roles. The WITCH FPV drone program was reported to be in training since the spring of 2025. One of the first battles involving the unit was of a joint drone strike mission with the CDF in the Falam Township in 12 February 2026. Wherein SAC forces attempted to advance. It is reported that the SAC inflicted multiple casualties and was repelled. In May 1, the WITCH unit released a drone strike compilation showing strikes on military targets in bunkers, support vehicles, military personnel stationed in various locations, including night operations in 27 May.
