= U.S. Hostage and Wrongful Detainee Day =

Federal day observed in the United States

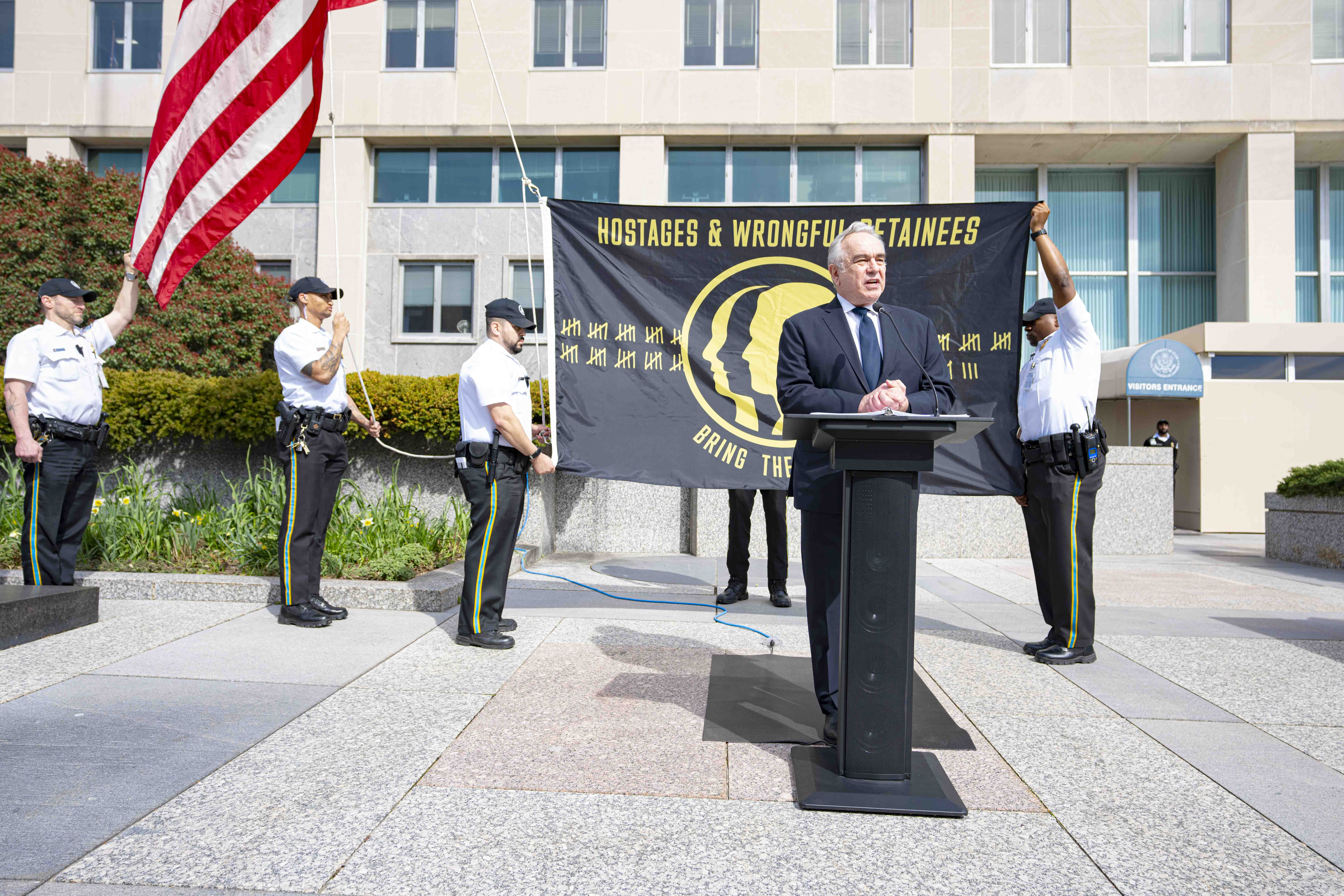
- Deputy Secretary Kurt Campbell attending a flag raising with the Office of the Special Presidential Envoy for Hostage Affairs at the State Department in Washington, D.C., March 8, 2024.
- Observed by: United States
- Type: National
- Date: March 9
- Frequency: Annual
- First time: 2024; 2 years ago
- Related to: National POW/MIA Recognition Day

U.S. Hostage and Wrongful Detainee Day is a day observed since 2023 when it was created with the passage of the "US Hostage and Wrongful Detainee Day Act of 2023". The day is observed on March 9th of every year.

== Observance ==
The first U.S. Hostage and Wrongful Detainee Day was held on March 9, 2024 and marked with a flag raising ceremony on March 8, 2024 on the steps of the State Department headquarters in Washington D.C. Under 36 U.S.C. § 904, the flag of U.S. Hostages and Wrongful Detainees is to be flown at the United States Capitol, the White House, and any buildings were the U.S. Secretary of State and U.S. Secretary of Defense have offices.

== U.S. Hostages and Wrongful Detainee Flag ==
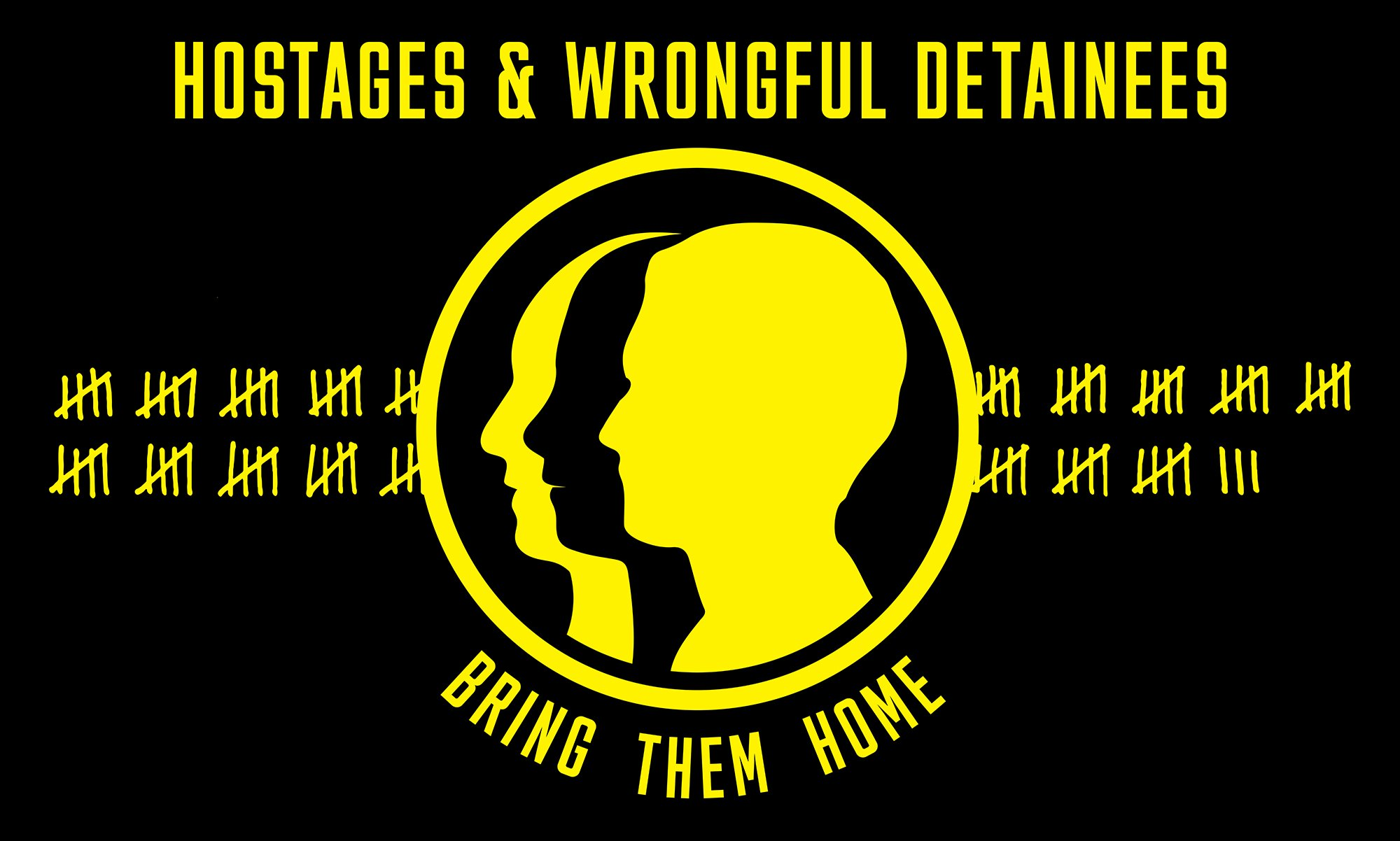
U.S. Hostages & Wrongful Detainees Flag

In addition to the designation of the holiday, the U.S. Hostages and Wrongful Detainee Day Act also designates and federally recognizes a flag of U.S. Hostages and Wrongful Detainees. The flag was originally designed for the Bring Our Families Home campaign by University of Oregon professor David Ewald, in collaboration with family members of U.S. hostages and wrongful detainees in the early 2020s.

Under law, the U.S. Hostages and Wrongful Detainees Flag is to be displayed on U.S. Hostage and Wrongful Detainee Day, Flag Day, Independence Day, and on any day on which a citizen or lawful permanent resident of the United States returns to the United States from being held hostage or wrongfully detained abroad, or dies while being held hostage or wrongfully detained abroad. When displayed together, the U.S. Hostages and Wrongful Detainees Flag should fly below, and not be larger than, the United States flag. It is generally flown immediately below or adjacent to the United States flag as second in order of precedence.

== See also ==
- List of Americans wrongfully imprisoned or detained abroad
- Wrongful detention
- Hostage diplomacy
- Special Presidential Envoy for Hostage Affairs
- Bring Our Families Home
- Disappearance of Robert Levinson
- James Foley (journalist)
