= Rhoda Torres =

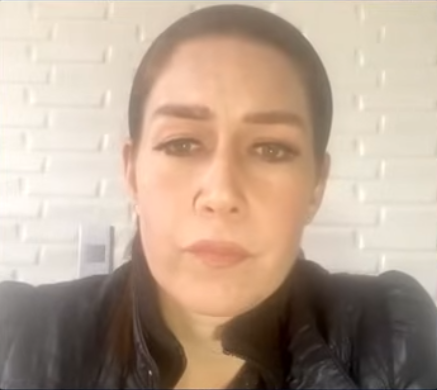
- In an online interview in 2025
- Born: 14 June 1978 (age 48); Caracas, Venezuela
- Occupation: Actress

Rhoda Torres (born 1978) is a Venezuelan actress. In 2002, she participated in the television series Bienvenidos, on the Televen channel, and has been a television actress in both Venezuela and the United States for several years. One of her most recent appearances was in the play ¿Dónde está Marilyn?, which she starred in twice in Venezuela and in 2016 at the Paseo Las Artes in Doral, Florida.

== Personal life ==
Rhoda's sister, Milena Torres, is also an actress and singer and has appeared in productions such as El Club de los Tigritos, Jugando a ganar, Atómico, Rugemanía, Mi Gorda Bella, and Isa TKM.
