= Youlin Chen =

Chinese-American seismologist

- Born: 1971 or 1972 (age 54–55); China
- Citizenship: United States
- Spouse: Yufang Rong

Academic work
- Discipline: Seismology

Youlin Chen (born 1971 or 1972) is a Chinese-American seismologist. Chen has been detained in China since 2024.

== Early and personal life ==
Chen was born in China in 1971 or 1972. He moved to the United States in 1998, and became a naturalized US citizen in 2011. He was based in Boston at the time of his detention in 2024.

According to Chen's wife, he has multiple medical conditions, including "diabetes, high blood pressure, [and] high cholesterol level".

== Career ==
In 2020, Chen authored a technical report under a contract from the State Department arms bureau to improve North Korean nuclear test monitoring for yield and magnitude.

Chen had previously collaborated with government and university seismologists in China, including leading a collaborative study published in 2024 on seismic energy in East Asia. He had also worked for a Florida-based consulting firm, EMR Solutions & Technology.

== 2024 detention in China ==
On November 5, 2024, Chen was detained at Beijing Capital International Airport by Chinese state security forces. He was subsequently interrogated, and on May 1, 2025, was charged with espionage. In March 2026, Chen was designated as wrongfully detained by US secretary of state Marco Rubio.

Chen's detention was followed by the restriction on the China Earthquake Networks Center's public raw seismic observations and information on March 26, 2026. This restriction signals a further suppression of Chinese seismic information, potentially impeding studies and causing increased concern for collaborators in China.

President Trump raised Chen's case with Chinese president Xi Jinping at their meeting in May 2026.

As of October 2026, Chen remains one of two American citizens designated by the State Department as wrongfully detained in China.

== Selected publications ==
- Chen, Youlin; Xu, Xiwei; Xie, Jiakang; Ghalib, Hafidh A A; Liang, Shanshan (2024-10-01). "Two-station Lg wave attenuation tomography in Eastern Asia". Geophysical Journal International. 239 (1): 49–69. doi:10.1093/gji/ggae255. ISSN 1365-246X.
- Tian, Chao; Sui, Haiqing; Chen, Youlin; Wang, Wenxi; Deng, Huijing (2025-01-01). "Estimating carbon emission reductions from China's "Zero-waste City" construction pilot program". Resources, Conservation and Recycling. 212 107975. Bibcode:2025RCR...21207975T. doi:10.1016/j.resconrec.2024.107975. ISSN 0921-3449.
