= David Lin (pastor) =

American pastor (born 1955)

- Born: China
- Citizenship: American

David Lin is an American pastor who was detained and imprisoned by the Chinese government from 2006 to 2024.

== Biography ==
Lin was born in China, later immigrating to the United States and gaining citizenship. He worked as an economic advisor to state officials in Iowa and California, later living in Orange County, California with his wife. He converted to Christianity following his wife's conversion. Lin has a daughter, Alice, who was born in the 1980s, and a son.

According to China Aid, Lin traveled to China frequently in the 1990s to support churches there, and he registered as a Christian minister with the Chinese government in 1999. The organization also has said Lin attempted to receive a missionary license from the Chinese government.

=== Imprisonment ===
In 2006, Lin returned to China in an attempt to establish a Christian missionary training center in Beijing. He was detained that same year, after working with a "house church" which was unauthorized by the Chinese government. He was formally arrested on charges of contract fraud in 2009.

Lin was convicted of contract fraud, and was sentenced to life in prison. He later received several sentence shortenings beginning in 2012; prior to his release in 2024, Lin had been scheduled to be released in 2029. During his imprisonment, Lin was housed with other foreign nationals. He established a prayer group with his fellow prisoners and translated the Bible into Chinese. He initially asked his family not to petition for his release, seeing his imprisonment as an opportunity from God to evangelize. In December 2018, his attitude shifted, following deteriorating health. He had lost at least five teeth as of 2023. His family began speaking about Lin's imprisonment publicly in 2019.

On September 15, 2024, the U.S. State Department announced that Lin had been freed and had arrived in San Antonio, Texas. At the time of his release, Lin had been one of three Americans detained in China whom the State Department considered wrongfully detained.
