= USS Makin Island (LHD-8) =

US Navy amphibious assault ship

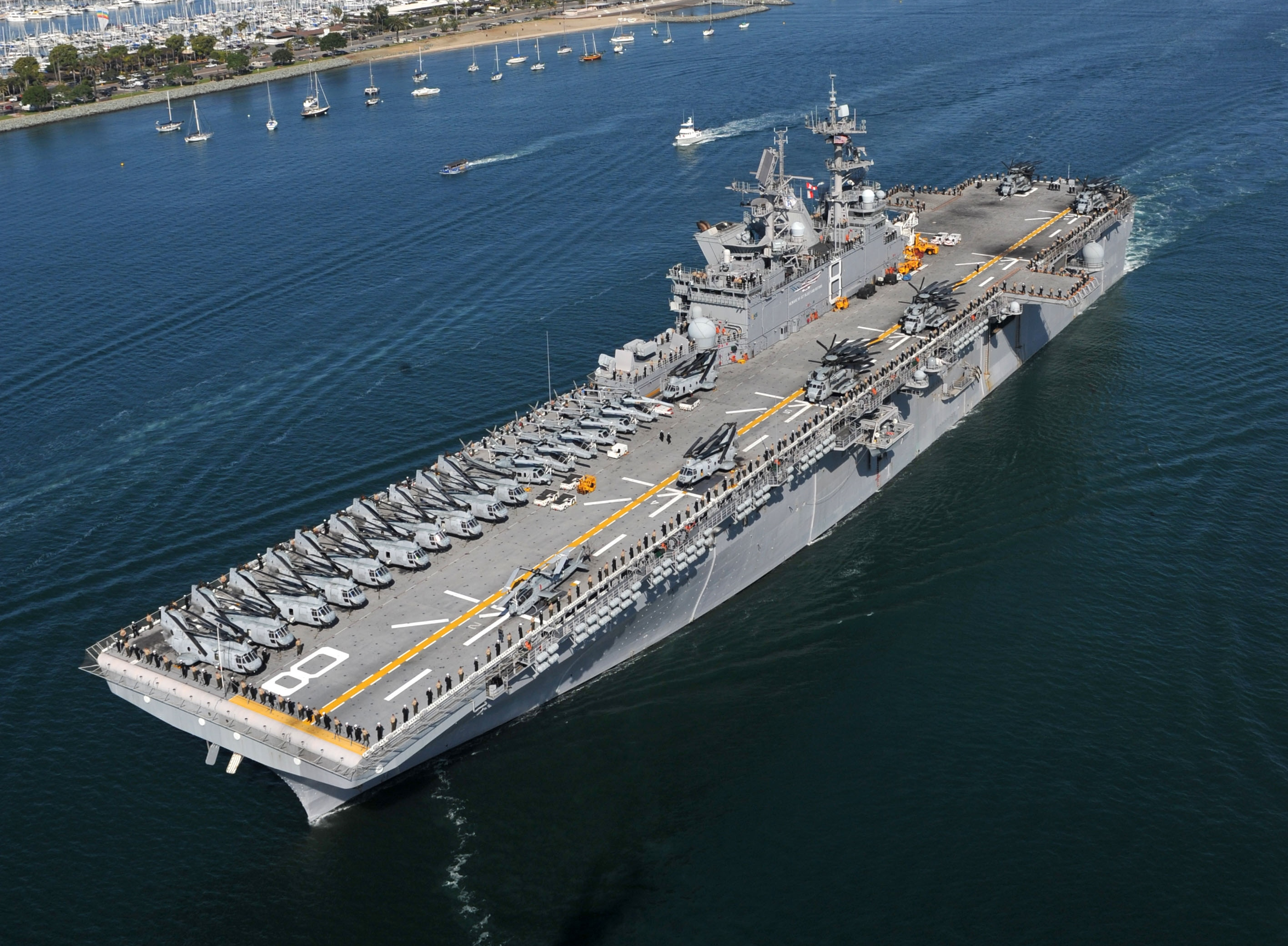
- USS Makin Island departs Naval Base San Diego, 2011

History

United States
- Name: USS Makin Island
- Namesake: Makin Island
- Awarded: 19 April 2002
- Builder: Ingalls Shipbuilding
- Laid down: 14 February 2004
- Sponsored by: Mrs. Silke Hagee, wife of Michael Hagee
- Christened: 19 August 2006
- Launched: 22 September 2006
- Acquired: 16 April 2009
- Commissioned: 24 October 2009
- Home port: San Diego, California
- Identification: MMSI number: 369970689; Callsign: NMKI; Hull number: LHD-8
- Motto: Gung Ho
- Status: in active service
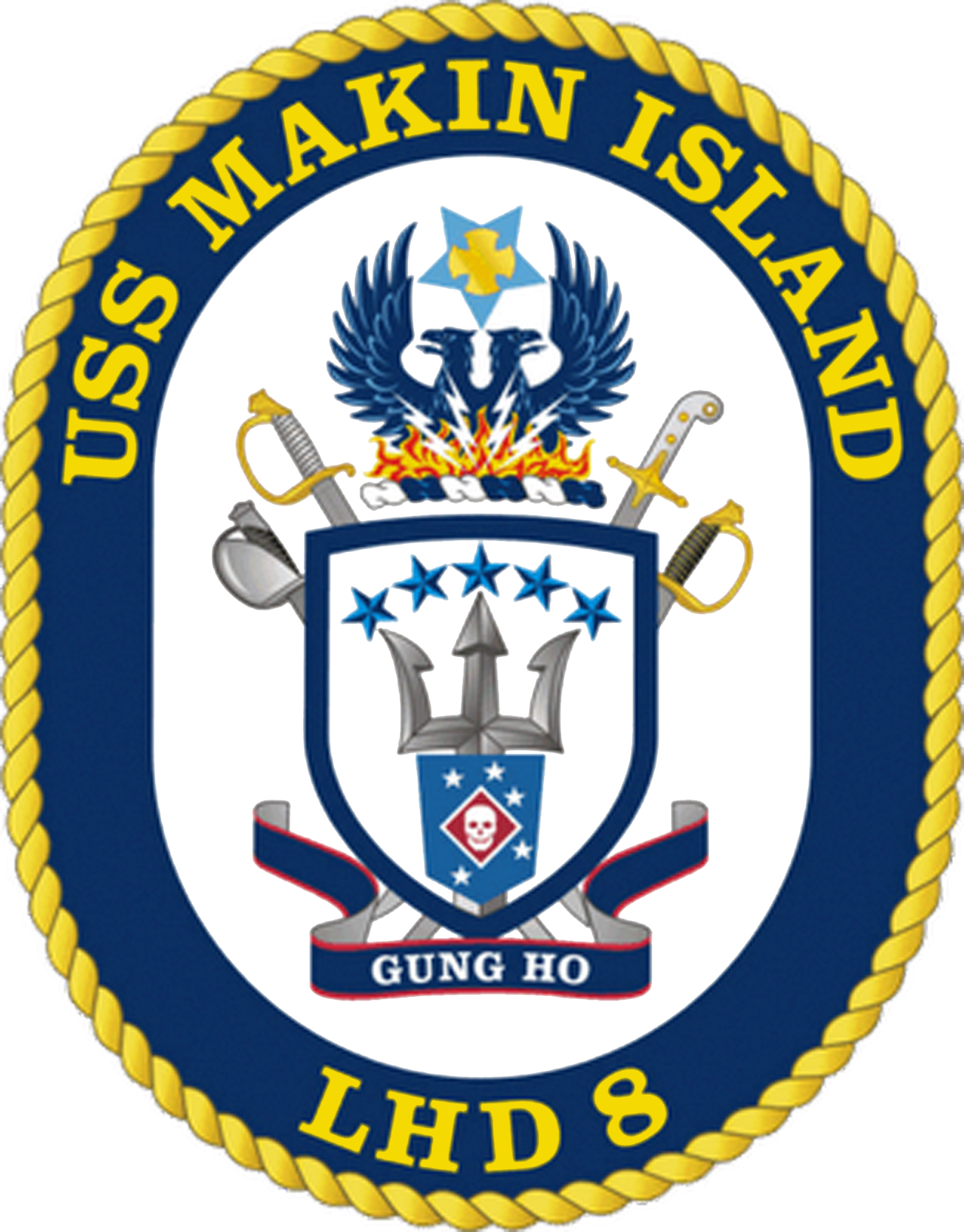
- Badge

General characteristics
- Type: Wasp-class Landing Helicopter Dock (LHD) amphibious assault ship
- Displacement: 40,500 long tons (41,150 t) full load
- Length: 843 ft (257 m)
- Beam: 104 ft (31.8 m)
- Draft: 27 ft (8.1 m)
- Installed power: 2 × 35,000 shp (26,000 kW) gas turbines (GE – LM 2500+) 2 x 5,000 shp (3,700 kW) electric motors 6 × 4,000 kW diesel generators (Fairbanks Morse Engines)
- Propulsion: Hybrid electric propulsion (CODLOG) driving two shafts 70,000 shaft horsepower (52,000 kW), 2 × 16.5 ft (5.0 m) diameter controllable pitch propellers (Rolls-Royce)
- Speed: 28 kn (52 km/h; 32 mph)
- Range: 9,500 nautical miles (17,600 km; 10,900 mi) at 20 kn (37 km/h; 23 mph)
- Well deck dimensions: 266-by-50-foot (81 by 15.2 m) by 28-foot (8.5 m) high
- Boats & landing craft carried: 3 Landing Craft Air Cushion or; 2 Landing Craft Utility or; 12 Landing Craft Mechanized
- Troops: 1,687 troops (plus 184 surge) Marine detachment
- Complement: 1,208
- Sensors & processing systems: 1 AN/SPQ-9B surface search & fire control radar; 1 AN/SPS-49 2-D air-search radar; 1 AN/SPS-48 3-D air-search radar; 1 AN/SPS-67 surface-search radar; 1 Mk23 Target Acquisition System (TAS); 1 AN/SPN-50 marshalling air traffic control radar; 1 AN/SPN-35 air traffic control radar; 1 AN/URN-25 TACAN system; 1 AN/UPX-24 Identification Friend or Foe
- Armament: Two RIM-116 Rolling Airframe Missile launchers; Two RIM-7 Sea Sparrow missile launchers; Two 20 mm Phalanx CIWS systems; Three 25 mm Mk 38 chain guns; Four .50 BMG machine guns
- Aircraft carried: Actual mix depends on the mission; Standard complement: 6 AV-8B Harrier II attack aircraft; or; 6 F-35B Lightning II stealth strike-fighters; 4 AH-1W/Z Super Cobra/Viper attack helicopter; 12 MV-22B Osprey assault support tiltrotor; 4 CH-53E Super Stallion heavy-lift helicopters; 3–4 UH-1Y Venom utility helicopters; Assault: 22+ MV-22B Osprey assault support tiltrotor; Sea control: 20 AV-8B Harrier II attack aircraft; or; 20 F-35B Lightning II stealth strike-fighters; 6 SH-60F/HH-60H ASW helicopters

USS Makin Island (LHD-8), a Wasp-class amphibious assault ship, is the second ship of the United States Navy to be named for Makin Island, target of the Marine Raiders' Makin Island raid early on in the United States' involvement in World War II.

Makin Island's task is to embark, deploy, and land elements of a Marine Corps landing force in an amphibious assault by helicopters, landing craft, and amphibious vehicles. The secondary or convertible mission for Makin Island is sea control and power projection.

== Design and construction ==
Makin Island is the eighth ship of the Wasp class, but features noteworthy technological advances. Changes from the previous LHD design include gas turbine main propulsion engines, all-electric auxiliaries, an advanced machinery control system, water-mist fire-protection systems, and the Navy's most advanced command and control and combat systems equipment. The new propulsion system allows the engines to be directly controlled from the throttles on the bridge, replacing the traditional engine order telegraphs on the earlier Wasp-class LHDs.

Makin Island was laid down on 14 February 2004 at Ingalls Shipbuilding, Pascagoula, Mississippi. The vessel has a light displacement of 28,176 long tons (28,628 t) and a full-load displacement of 41,684 long tons (42,353 t) with a dead weight is 13,508 long tons (13,725 t). She has an overall length of 847 feet (258 m) and a waterline length of 778 feet (237 m). (Note: Sources differ on the overall length of Makin Island. The length included here is from the Naval Vessel Register and is therefore considered the most accurate.) The extreme beam is 118 feet (36 m) with the beam at the waterline being 106 feet (32 m) and the draft is 28 feet (8.5 m). Her maximum speed is 28 knots (52 km/h; 32 mph).

The ship's armament consists of two RIM-116 Rolling Airframe Missile launchers, two RIM-7 Sea Sparrow surface-to-air missile launchers, three Mk 38 25-mm close-in guns, two Mk 15 Phalanx CIWS, four M2 Browning .50 caliber machine guns, and a ceremonial gun.

Makin Island is the eighth Wasp-class amphibious assault ships to be ordered for the U.S. Navy, but differs from her older sister ships in her propulsion system. The previous Wasp-class vessels used steam boilers and steam turbines to drive the propellers, while Makin Island is the first U.S. Navy vessel to use a hybrid propulsion system consisting of a combined diesel electric and gas turbine propulsion system.

Makin Island has two 35,000 shaft horsepower (26,000 kW) General Electric LM 2500+ gas turbines each connected to a separate 20:1 ratio main reduction gear, which then drive two 16-foot-6-inch (5.03 m) diameter Rolls-Royce controllable pitch propellers. Gas turbines have a high power-to-weight ratio compared to steam or diesel power, but are only efficient near their maximum power output. In Makin Island, the gas turbines are used to power the ship above 12 knots. Below 12 knots, ship propulsion is provided by two 5,000-shaft-horsepower (3,700 kW) AC electric motors connected to a second input shaft on the main reduction gears. When powered by the electric motors, the gas turbines are decoupled from the main reduction gear and braked to prevent spinning. When the gas turbines are engaged, the electric motors are similarly decoupled from the drive system. The propeller shafts can be driven at lower speeds by slowing down the electric motors. Variable drive speed is achieved with an Alstom variable frequency drive system. Power for the electric motors comes from the ship's service electrical system, which is provided by six 4000 kW generators powered by Fairbanks Morse diesel engines.

In conventional Navy ships, the steam boiler drives both the propellers and ship service steam turbine generators to provide electric power for the vessel. The boilers also provide steam to heat the ship in colder climates. Since Makin Island does not have steam boilers, she uses the diesel electric generators for all shipboard power services. Specifically, instead of steam heating, she uses electric heating for laundry and hot water supply as well as for heating interior compartments in cold climates.

The gas turbine propulsion plant, with all electric auxiliaries, is a program first for large-deck amphibious assault ships and provides significant savings in manpower and maintenance costs associated with traditional steam-powered amphibious ships. The ship carries four reverse-osmosis water-purification systems, each capable of processing 50,000 US gallons (190,000 L) of fresh water per day.

The same propulsion systems experimented with in Makin Island will also be used on the America-class amphibious assault ships.

She was christened on 19 August 2006, sponsored by Silke Hagee, wife of General Michael Hagee, Commandant of the Marine Corps, and launched on 15 September 2006. In the aftermath of Hurricane Katrina, U.S. Navy officials announced that several ships under construction at Ingalls Shipbuilding had been damaged by the storm, including Makin Island and two Arleigh Burke-class destroyers. The ship's completion was delayed due to rewiring during 2008 to repair incorrect wiring installation.

== Service history ==
=== 2009 ===
Makin Island was delivered to the U.S. Navy on 16 April 2009 and was commissioned at Pascagoula, Mississippi, without ceremony on 26 June 2009 with Captain Bob Kopas in command.

Makin Island deployed 10 July 2009 and sailed around South America via the Strait of Magellan, in which the crew continued to train, obtaining underway certifications in preparation for her arrival in San Diego. During the deployment, Makin Island conducted theater security cooperation activities with Brazil, Chile, and Peru, focusing on working closely with partner nation civilian and maritime forces to share methods and training. She arrived in her home port of San Diego on 14 September 2009. Captain Kopas stated in an interview on local radio that Makin Island had saved about US$2 million in fuel, compared with a conventional propulsion system, on her voyage from Mississippi around South America to San Diego.

Her formal commissioning ceremony took place on 24 October 2009 at Naval Air Station North Island, Coronado, near San Diego. Six USMC veterans of the Makin Island raid attended the ceremony.

=== 2010 ===
Damage to a turning gear delayed the ship's final check-out trials from August to September 2010.

Makin Island visited San Francisco in October 2010 as part of the city's 2010 Fleet Week festivities. She returned to Fleet Week in 2012 after her maiden deployment to the 5th and 7th Fleet area of operations.

=== 2014 ===
On 1 October 2014, during the early months of Operation Inherent Resolve, Makin Island was part of a naval task force in the northern Gulf with the 11th MEU embarked and engaged in active battle operations against ISIS. Shortly after take-off, an MV-22 lost power and dropped towards the water's surface, prompting two of the crew on board to bail out into the water. The pilot was ultimately able to regain control and land, while other aircraft, watercraft, and ships from the task force began search and rescue efforts. One of the two crewmembers was found. The other, a marine NCO, was eventually declared lost, and later determined to be the first American casualty of the operation.

During the December 2014 US hostage rescue operation in Yemen, wounded hostages were flown to the ship for medical treatment while she was posted in the Gulf of Aden.

=== 2016 ===
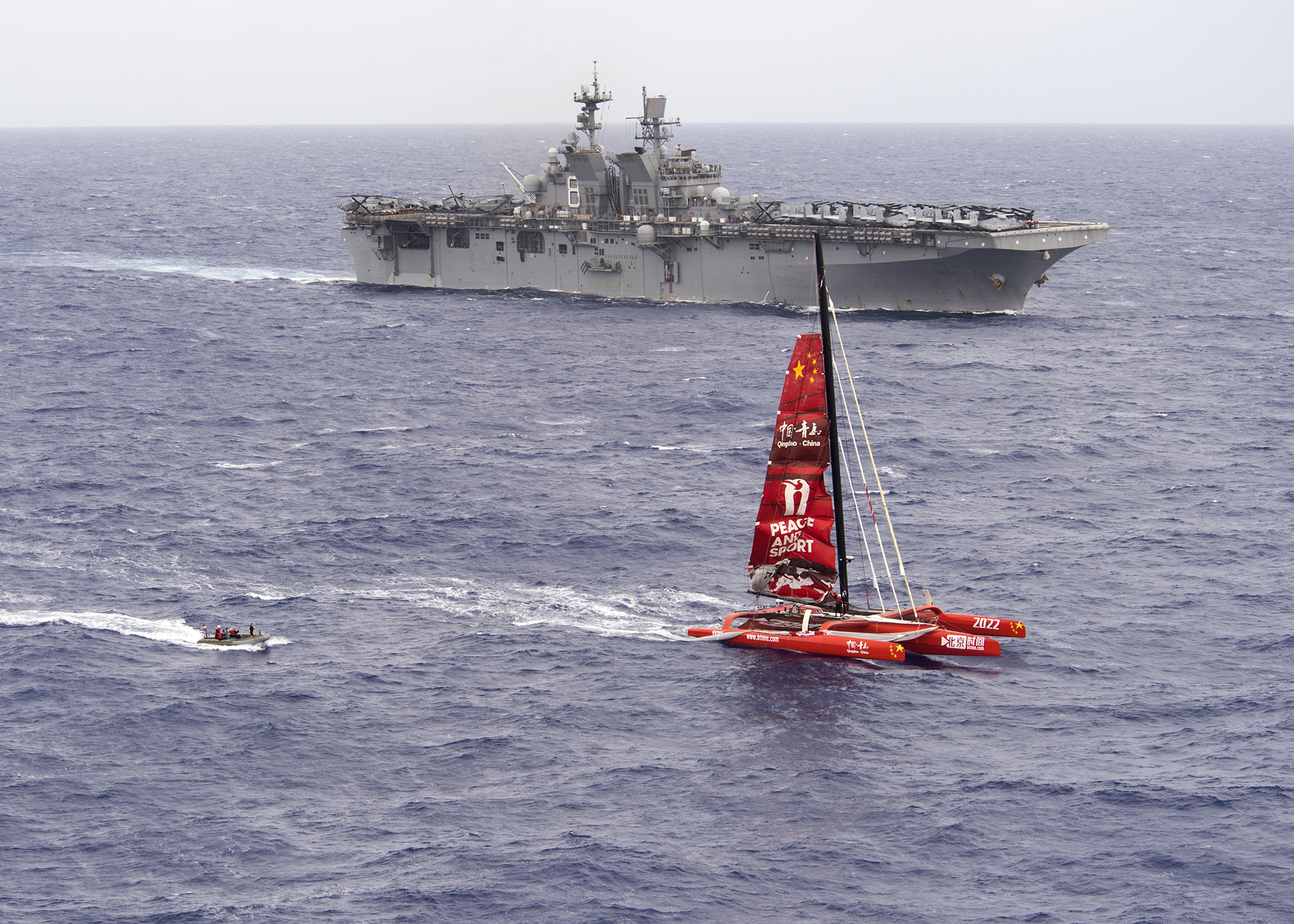
In 2016 Makin Island was dispatched to rescue the solo sailor aboard the Chinese vessel Qingdao China.

In October 2016 Makin Island was deployed alongside the US Coast Guard to search for missing Chinese sailor Guo Chuan, who was attempting to break the world record for solo sailing from San Francisco to Shanghai. Makin Island reached his yacht, Qingdao China, on 27 October, but found her adrift with no sign of the sailor, roughly 620 miles (1,000 km) northwest of Oʻahu, Hawaiʻi. After searching an area of 4,600 square miles (12,000 km^{2}) without locating the missing sailor, Makin Island's crew recovered his personal items and left the yacht for later salvage.

== Hybrid diesel electric propulsion ==
Makin Island departed on her maiden deployment as the US Navy's first hybrid-drive warship: part gas-turbine and part diesel-electric. About 70% of the time Makin Island can use diesel-electric propulsion, saving on fuel as diesel engines are optimized for cruising, and consume much less fuel than gas turbines. When she needs to travel quickly, at 12 knots or more, the gas turbines are used. This arrangement is also known as combined diesel-electric or gas.

On an average day, Makin Island uses 15,000 US gallons (57,000 L) of fuel, versus 35,000 to 40,000 US gallons (130,000–150,000 L) on an older steam ship of its type, according to Captain James Landers, commanding officer.

The downside is the logistical "tail", which means it takes a while to get parts. Further, the ship is software dependent, which is an independent source of failure.

Internal heating is provided by electrical, instead of steam, heaters. At temperatures above 20 °F (−7 °C) excess heating capacity can be reallocated for additional electric propulsion.

== Awards ==
- Battle "E" – (2012, 2016, 2023)
- Admiral James Flatley Memorial Award for Naval Aviation Safety - (2016)
- CNO Afloat Safety Award (PACFLT) - (2020)
- Captain Edward F. Ney Memorial Award for outstanding food service - (2012, 2014, 2022)
- Marjorie Sterrett Battleship Fund Award - (2023)
