= Travis Timmerman =

American former detainee

Travis Pete Timmerman was an American former detainee who was detained in Syria in June 2024. He was discovered wandering in Damascus suburbs following the fall of the city.

Timmerman went missing in June after entering Syria on foot from Lebanon. He spent months confined in a Syrian prison before the rebellion in the city. He said his experience in prison "wasn't too bad". Timmerman said he was attempting to reach Jordan when he was intercepted by the residents and imprisoned.

He claimed his reason for being in Syria was "spiritual purposes" pertaining to his Christian faith.

Before entering Syria, Timmerman had last been seen at a church in Budapest, Hungary. Timmerman was previously a resident of the US state of Missouri.
