= Nisab district =

Coordinates: 14.5256°N 46.4475°E

Nisab District
- District
- Interactive map of Nisab District
- Country: Yemen
- Governorate: Shabwah

Population (2003)
  - Total: 42,050
- Time zone: UTC+3 (Yemen Standard Time)

Nisab District (Arabic: مديرية نصاب) is a district of the Shabwah Governorate in Yemen. As of 2003, the district had a population of 42,050 inhabitants.
