= Hostage Recovery Fusion Cell =

The Presidency of Barack Obama established the Hostage Recovery Fusion Cell on June 24, 2015. The Federal Bureau of Investigation is the lead agency, coordinating the work of staff from the FBI, the Department of State, the Department of Defense and the Treasury Department.

By its third anniversary the Cell had aided in the recovery of 180 American citizens.

The Cell has a team to assist the family members of hostages. Rob Saale, director of the Cell from 2017-2019, described the government treating families poorly, prior to the Cell's creation.
