= Foreign involvement in the Myanmar civil war (2021–present) =

Many countries and international organizations have influenced the Myanmar civil war (2021–present) to various extents. Myanmar's neighboring countries have largely had the most influence. Myanmar is bordered by India, Bangladesh, Thailand, China, and Laos.

== Institutions ==
=== United Nations ===
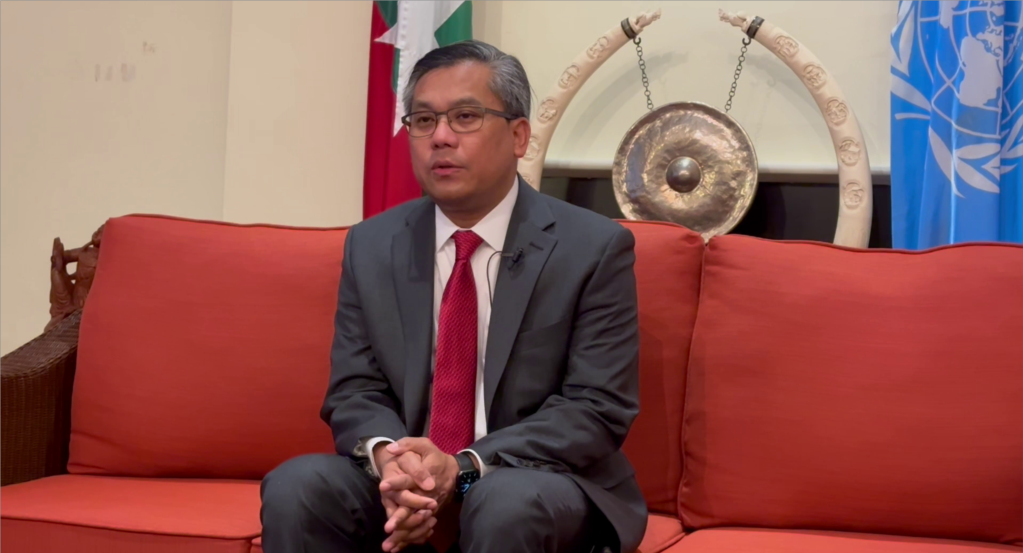
NUG's UN Ambassador Kyaw Moe Tun talks in an interview in 2022

In June 2021, the United Nations General Assembly passed a non-binding resolution asking member states to impose an arms embargo on Myanmar. Two hundred international organisations, including Amnesty International and Human Rights Watch have continued to press the UN and its member states to adopt a global arms embargo.

=== ASEAN ===
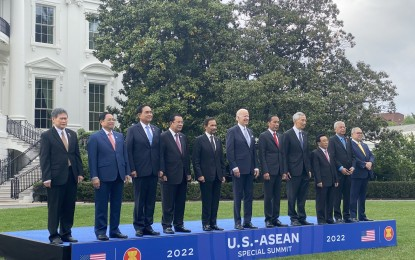
Myanmar absent at the US-ASEAN Summit 2022 in Washington, D.C

ASEAN has blocked Myanmar from participating in regional summits since the 2021 coup. For instance, during the 2022 ASEAN summit, Myanmar's chair remained empty. This condition persisted until New Zealand invited the junta to two ASEAN summits hosted in Wellington in April 2024. ASEAN member-states have not taken a consistent, coordinated approach with respect to the ongoing civil war, due to internal divisions. Brunei, Indonesia, Malaysia, the Philippines and Singapore were initially strongly opposed to the military junta. Sasa, a cabinet minister with National Unity Government (NUG) of Myanmar, stated the group had failed to act even after the SAC "blatantly disregarded ASEAN's Five-Point Consensus", which stipulates an end to the violence, undermining the bloc's standing.

The Indonesian government led by President Prabowo Subianto has shifted Indonesia's stance to re-engagement with the junta, with Foreign Minister Sugiono visiting Myanmar in June 2026, expressing support for boosting bilateral ties, and stating that Myanmar is "part of the ASEAN family".

Prime minister Hun Sen of Cambodia was the first head of government to visit Myanmar since the coup in January 2022, in his capacity as ASEAN Chair. Sen said not long before the visit that he believed junta representatives should be allowed to attend ASEAN meetings.

Thailand, during the leadership of former Prime Minister of Thailand Prayut Chan-o-cha, was a key ally of the junta, using back-channel contacts in mid-2021 to shape Thailand's diplomatic options, especially as these were related to ASEAN. On 30 June 2022, when the Myanmar Air Force allegedly violated Thai airspace, Thailand scrambled a defence attache. Later, Prayuth said that the incident was "not a big deal". After the 2023 Thai general election, the new Prime Minister Srettha Thavisin has shown support for the military's Nationwide Ceasefire Agreement urging all parties in Myanmar to stay on the path for peace and stability. In April 2024, Thavisin remarked in an interview with Reuters that the Tatmadaw's power was weakening, and expressed support for stability in Myanmar, which borders Thailand. Under the administration of Anutin Charnvirakul, the Thai government has reapproached Naypyidaw, going as far as to allow current President Min Aung Hlaing to visit Bangkok, increasing the international legitimacy of the central government of Myanmar. Furthermore, Thai border forces have seized weapons believed bound for resistance forces, while keeping pressure on all rebel groups that operate near Thailand. This poses a severe logistical issue to anti-government forces that rely on the border between Thailand and Myanmar as a safe haven from Sit-tat airstrikes.

Singapore initially emphasised the importance of separating business from politics, but subsequently became wary of doing business with Myanmar. Prime Minister Lee Hsien Loong described the use of lethal force in the suppression of anti-junta protestors as "just not acceptable" and "disastrous". In 2022, Lee continued supporting the exclusion of the military regime from ASEAN meetings until the regime cooperates on ASEAN's peace plans. Currently, Singapore does not recognise the military junta. Before the war, Singapore has been a major equipment supplier for the junta's weapons factories but had banned the trade of weapons after the coup. After a report by Thomas Andrews, the United Nations' special rapporteur on the human rights situation in Myanmar, revealed that several Singapore-based firms had served as intermediary companies for the junta, collectively shipping 254 million US dollars' worth of arms to the junta between 2021 and 2023, the Singapore government began conducting an investigation and crackdown on companies alleged to be conducting arms-related trade with the junta.

As of December 2023, East Timor remains the only government to have openly expressed sympathies to the anti-regime forces in Myanmar. In August 2023, the State Administration Council expelled the East Timorese ambassador in retaliation for the East Timorese government meeting with the NUG.

From 25 to 30 November 2025, the NUG, the Committee Representing Pyidaungsu Hluttaw, the Restoration Council of Shan State, the Chin National Front, and other anti-junta groups attended a workshop in Indonesia about applying historical lessons from Indonesia's statehood to Myanmar. On 1 December, the State Security and Peace Commission junta attended a separate workshop.

=== European Union and NATO ===
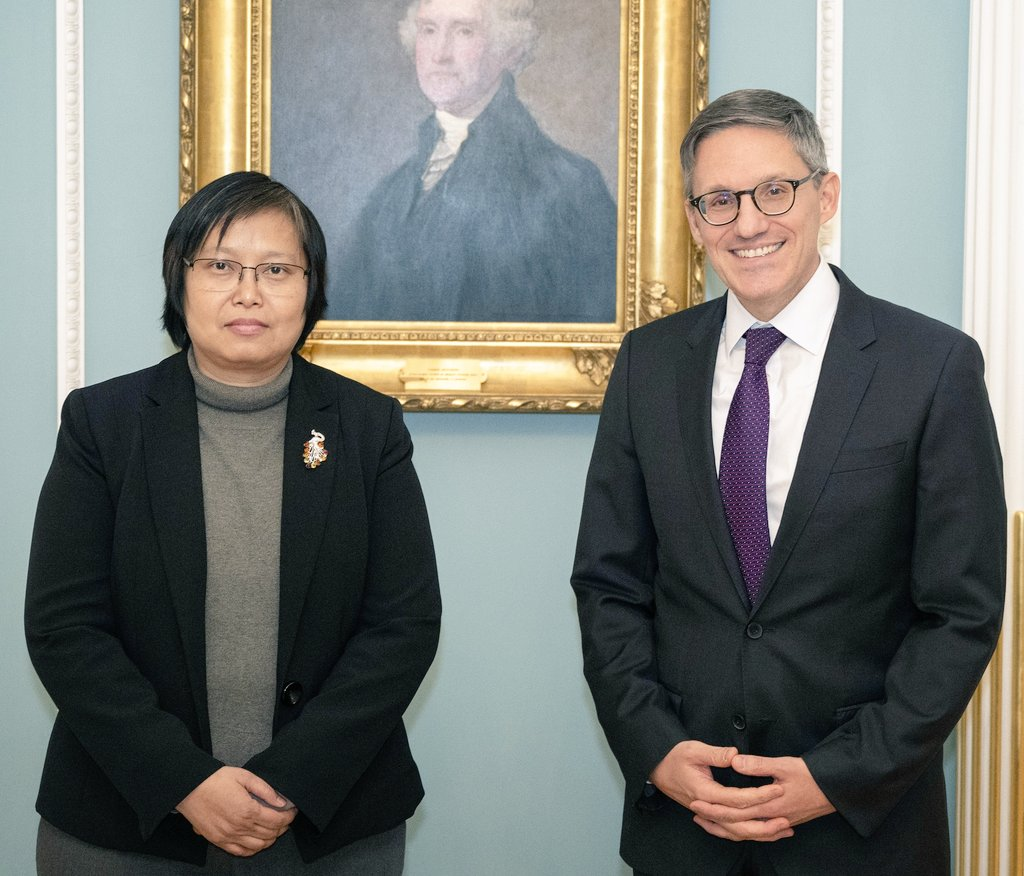
American foreign policy director Derek Chollet meets NUG's Foreign Minister Zin Mar Aung, February 2024.

The United States, the United Kingdom, Canada, and the European Union have, in response to the ongoing violence, sanctioned individuals and organisations associated with the Burmese military. However, the effectiveness of these sanctions has been undermined by poor coordination among the governments and the lack of sanctions against high-impact targets. As of February 2023, only 13% of Burmese sanctions targets were sanctioned by the US, the UK and the EU. Further, the UK and US governments have not sanctioned Myanma Oil and Gas Enterprise (MOGE), which is the country's largest source of foreign currency. Burmese sanctions targets have also evaded international sanctions by channeling funds through affiliated firms. For instance, a subsidiary of Myanma Economic Holdings Limited, a sanctioned military-owned conglomerate, created a new affiliated firm to import palm oil.

On 23 December 2022, the US Congress passed and US President Joe Biden signed the Burma Unified through Rigorous Military Accountability Act (BURMA Act) into law, which provides the president with additional discretionary authority to make policy changes with respect to Myanmar. The law enables the president to provide "non-lethal assistance" to NUG, EAOs, PDFs, and pro-democracy organisations, to provide humanitarian aid to the country, to impose new sanctions, including on MOGE, and enables the secretary of state to assist civilian and international entities with identifying and documenting war crimes, crimes against humanity, and genocide in Myanmar.

American foreign policy director Derek Chollet claimed the U.S. has provided nearly US$400 million in non-lethal aid to pro-democracy groups in Myanmar. He has already met with NUG's Foreign Minister Zin Mar Aung and several armed group leaders, including representatives from the Kachin Independence Army.

A passage from The Diplomat thought the U.S. would gain an enormous strategic advantage vis-à-vis China if the U.S. provided just a little more support to Myanmar's resistance forces, hasting the downfall of the junta and the restoration of democracy in Myanmar.

In April 2024, the European Union condemned the public executions held by MNDAA "in the strongest term", calling them "an inhuman and degrading punishment that represents an ultimate denial of human dignity", and added that upholding the rule of law in accordance with international standards is an "effort integral to the aspirations for federal democracy".

On 3 February 2026, U.S. President Donald Trump renewed sanctions against the Myanmar military by extending Executive Order 14014 by 1 year. Simultaneously, he signed the Consolidated Appropriations Act that included a clause authorizing $121,000,000 for humanitarian programs and non-lethal aid under the BURMA Act.

== Countries ==
=== Bangladesh ===
In August 2022, Bangladesh strongly protested territorial violations when two Myanmar Army mortar shells hit a Rohingya refugee camp in Bangladesh and when a junta helicopter entered Bangladeshi airspace and fired a shell. Aung Kyaw Moe, the ambassador of Myanmar to Bangladesh, was called four times by the Bangladesh ministry of foreign affairs in 2022 due to multiple violations of Bangladesh's airspace in the Naikhongchhari border area by the Myanmar Army.

On 3 February 2024, intensifying clashes between the Arakan Army and Tatmadaw in Rakhine state lead to mortar shells and bullets landing in Bangladesh, injuring civilians and prompting local villagers to flee. Bangladeshi authorities closed schools and madrasas in border villages. As tensions increased, Bangladesh strengthened the Bangladesh Police and Bangladesh Coast Guard to be stationed to resist any intrusion through the borders. Three hundred and twenty-seven Myanmar Border Guard Police personnel sought refuge in Bangladesh, where they were disarmed and sheltered by the Border Guard Bangladesh (BGB). Two days later, the Prime Minister of Bangladesh Sheikh Hasina instructed the Bangladesh Armed Forces and BGB to have patience regarding the situation in Myanmar. On 7 February BGB Director Mohammad Ashrafuzzaman Siddiqui recommended suspending the naval route to St. Martin's Island in Bangladesh due to the increasing border tensions, accordingly, sea travel to St. Martin's Island is indefinitely closed down by the district administration of Cox's Bazar from 10 February. On 8 February 2024, the Tatmadaw agreed to send a ship to take back the stranded BGP personnel in Bangladesh.

=== China ===
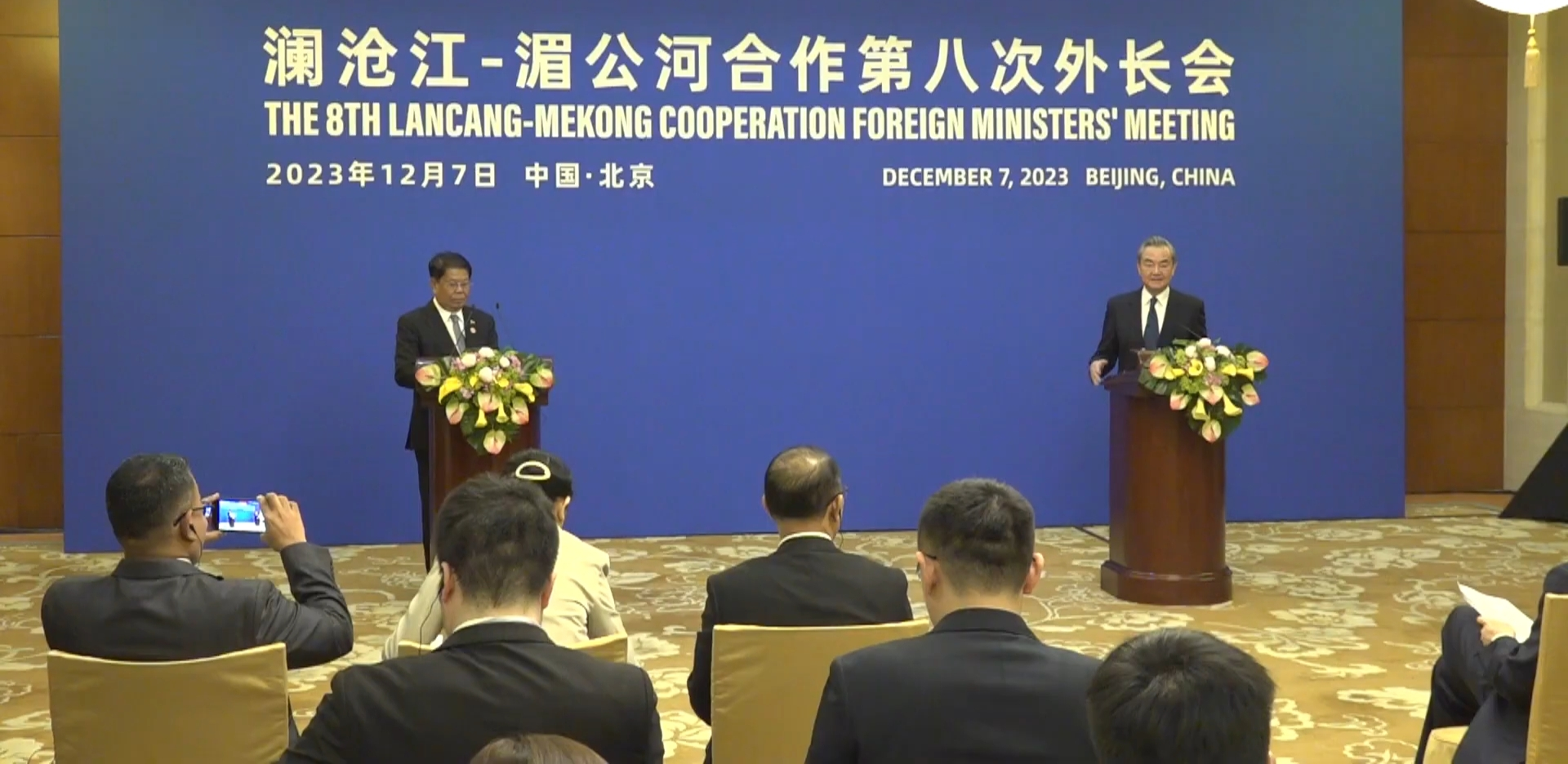
In 2023, director of the Central Foreign Affairs Commission Office of the Chinese Communist Party Wang Yi and Myanmar's Foreign Minister Than Swe jointly meet the press after the eighth LMC Foreign Ministers' Meeting

Since the coup d'état, China and Russia have supported the military junta and have been its main arms suppliers. China is Myanmar's largest trading partner. China has also been accused of tacitly supporting the junta. China and Russia have blocked any substantive action against Myanmar's military at the United Nations Security Council, while the country's security forces have reportedly used Chinese and Russian-supplied weapons to perpetrate human rights violations.

Chinese support for the junta has led to a rise in popular anti-Chinese sentiment in Myanmar.

In December 2022, China's special envoy to Myanmar, Deng Xijun, engaged with the military junta in Naypyidaw. After his visit, the Burmese military pulled 30 battalions from the Northeastern Command, and redeployed them to launch major offensives against pro-democracy forces in other areas. However, concerns later grew over allegations of China no longer 'restraining' the influence of the insurgents, which some viewed as a response to the Burmese military's inaction over Chinese citizens being forced to work in scam centres in northern Shan state.

China is particularly sensitive to Western support for EAOs along the Burmese–Chinese border, and has moved to simultaneously support the military junta and powerful EAOs like the United Wa State Army, which has supported pro-democracy forces. In response to the BURMA Act passed by the United States in 2022, the Government of China increased diplomatic efforts to engage EAOs and the military junta, to protect Chinese business and geopolitical interests, though the country claimed that it does not intend to normalise relations with the military junta. Annual cross border trade between China and Myanmar before the coup was estimated to over 5 billion (in U.S. dollars) annually.

The fact that the Three Brotherhood Alliance's Operation 1027 in late 2023 was carried out near the China–Myanmar border may indicate a shift in China's stance. The status quo in that area had previously been guaranteed by a China-mediated ceasefire. This change in stance was attributed by analysts to concerns about cyber-scam centers, the pursuit of favorable concessions from the junta on the China-Myanmar Economic Corridor, and the opportunity to influence the PDF in light of evolving dynamics between the NUG and EAO groups. On 13 November 2023, China issued arrest warrants for junta-aligned Ming Xuecheng and his family members for their involvement in online scamming operations. According to The Diplomat, this move signaled China's "tacit support for the removal of the Kokang SAZ's leadership". China issued more arrest warrants in December for ten high-ranking Kokang officials and business leaders for being members of "family criminal gangs", including the founder of the Kokang region's Border Guard Forces, Bai Xuoqian. The junta signalled its unhappiness at China's role in Operation 1027 and allowed anti-China demonstrations outside the embassy in Yangon in November.

The International Crisis Group said China seeks to maintain relations with all the main parties to preserve its leverage and stop geopolitical rivals from capitalising on turmoil.

On 6 December 2023, Chinese foreign minister and CCP Central Foreign Affairs Commission Office director Wang Yi urged to "achieve domestic reconciliation" and "continue the political transformation process" in Myanmar during a meeting with Myanmar's Foreign Minister Than Swe. On 4 January 2024, which is Myanmar's Independence Day, China opted to remain silent and did not send a congratulatory message, unlike prior years when General Secretary of the Chinese Communist Party Xi Jinping personally sent such congratulatory messages. NUG had written to Beijing officially to request China to stop providing arms to the ruling military junta, and received an acknowledgement of receipt without substantive reply.

Since 2024, Beijing has played a key role in reintegrating Myanmar back into the international community, pressuring rebel groups operating in Shan State to reopen the Muse-Mandalay road, a key logistical artery for Chinese imports/exports and the wider Belt and Road Initiative. In a video recorded by pro-Tatmadaw media during the 2025 Tianjin SCO summit, Min Aung Hlaing personally thanked China for "exerting pressure on the armed groups in the border regions for the development of northern Myanmar."

China's foreign ministry announced that a formal ceasefire agreement was signed between the Myanmar military and Myanmar National Democratic Alliance Army (MNDAA) following talks in Kunming, and starting on 18 January 2025. Myanmar Now reported that under China's pressure, MNDAA had "agreed to return control of the northern Shan State capital to the Myanmar military regime," and that ceasefire agreement terms may include MNDAA's withdrawal from Lashio by June. The Myanmar Now article notes that commander Peng Daxun had been "summoned to China’s Yunnan Province in late October and held there indefinitely" under detention, and his "status and whereabouts are still unknown". The Irrawaddy, citing a Federal Political Negotiation and Consultative Committee source, reported that Chinese authorities have placed the MNDAA leader under house arrest "to pressure his troops to withdraw from the northern Shan State capital Lashio".

During the Kyaukphyu clashes in Rakhine State where major Chinese projects are located, about 20 skilled Chinese soldiers were reportedly operating drones to attack on Arakan Army on behalf of the Myanmar military junta. According to the BBC and Irrawaddy, the AA's location in Rakhine State, which borders other regional countries like India, limits China's ability to pressure it into a ceasefire, unlike the MNDAA and TNLA which has done ceasefire under Chinese pressure. During Chinese Foreign Minister Wang Yi's visit to Naypyidaw on 25–26 April, Min Aung Hlaing reportedly sought China's help in negotiating peace with the Arakan Army and assistance in recovering cities from Rakhine State.

=== India ===
India, which represents Myanmar's fourth-largest export market and fifth-largest import partner, has continued a business-as-usual approach to cross-border relations and continues to recognize the military junta. State-owned and private Indian companies, including Yantra India, supplied arms and raw materials to the junta, enabling the military to conduct surveillance and boost its artillery and missile stocks. A 2023 UN report alleges that these arms were likely to be used in the commission of international crime and that companies have avoided sanctions through shell companies. The India–Myanmar border is 1,021 miles (1,643 km) in length and runs from the tripoint with China in the north to the tripoint with Bangladesh in the south. Amid escalating clashes in Rakhine, India urged its citizens to avoid travel to Rakhine State in early February 2024.

India's consistent cooperation with the junta, at some point, is believed to be due to the consistent fear over Chinese involvement, rather than being sympathetic to the junta; India's relations with China have been hostile due to ongoing territorial conflicts, and India is suspicious of Chinese involvement out of fear that it could be part of China's grand strategy to isolate India, plus China also has several involvement in the ongoing Insurgency in Northeast India. As for the results, although India might have been acutely aware of the authoritarian and inhuman nature of the junta, New Delhi has opted to ignore this in order to prevent Myanmar from failing to China's hands, a strategy that is met with criticism for questionable outcomes.

=== Russia and Ukraine ===
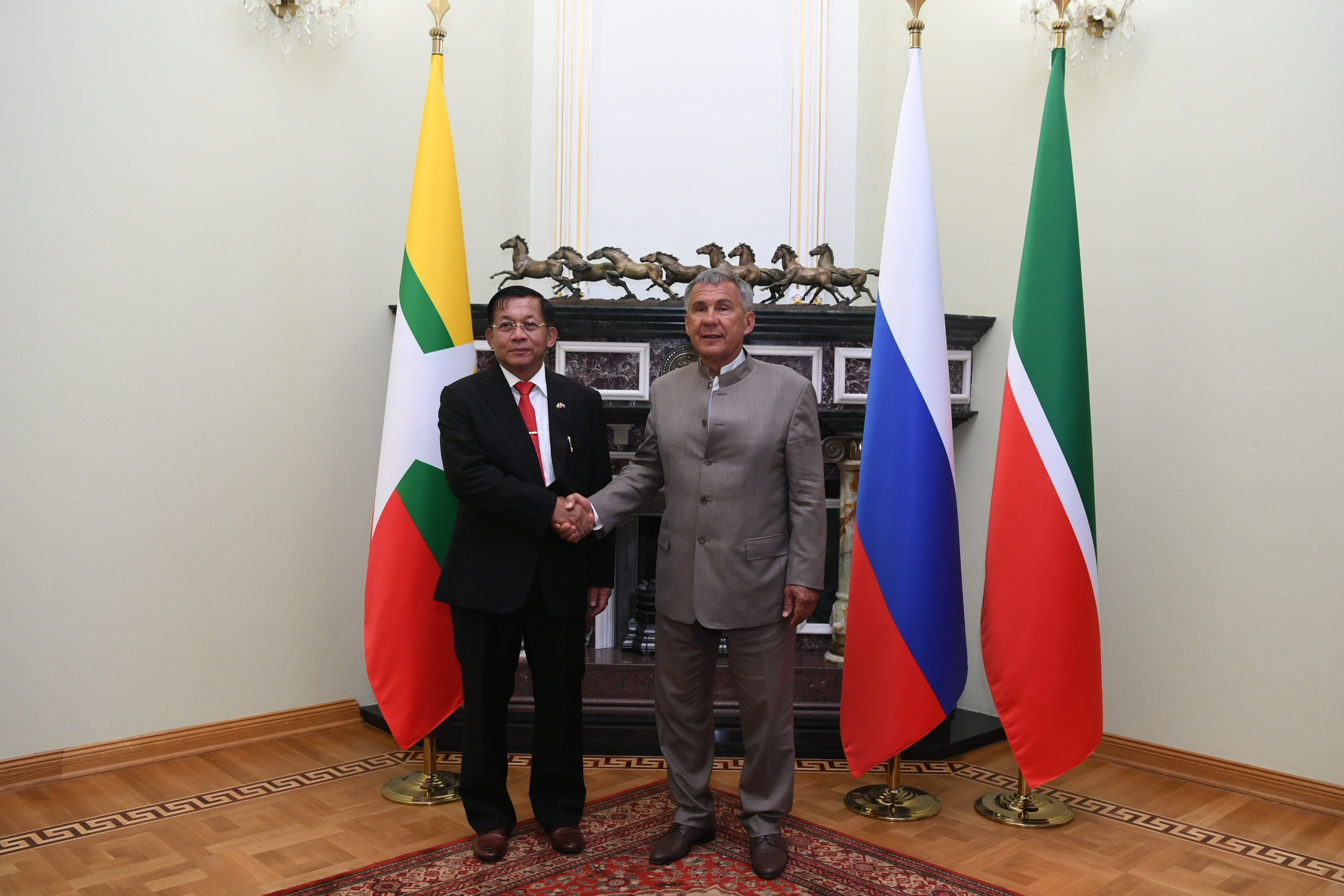
Min Aung Hlaing meets Head Rais Rustam Minnikhanov of Tatarstan in Russia, June 2021.

Russia has embraced deeper ties with the Burmese military junta as the civil war progressed. Russia has supplied materiel, military training for over 50 Myanmar Air Force pilots, and diplomatic backing to the regime. Min Aung Hlaing has visited Russia several times, personally meeting with Russian president Vladimir Putin in September 2022. Russia was among the few countries (Note: Belarus, Cambodia, North Korea, Russia, and Syria sent congratulatory messages to the State Administration Council for Myanmar's Independence Day on 4 January 2024.) to send a congratulatory message to the junta on Myanmar's Independence Day. In March 2024, Tom Andrews, the United Nations Special Rapporteur on Human Rights in Myanmar, saw Russia still being the number one source of weapons for the junta.

The military junta backed the 2022 Russian invasion of Ukraine. Russian tactics from the invasion have also influenced the junta's doctrine in the civil war, such as the development of a drone warfare apparatus reliant on cheap loitering munitions and human wave attacks. A November 2026 report by Intelligence Online also found Russian drone operators "conducting training missions and occasionally providing operational support" for the junta in Shan State and the Bago Region.

Ukraine's military intelligence works alongside resistance forces. However, the country has also been linked to the junta's import of Soviet Union-era aviation equipment.

== Non-state militant groups ==
On 24 March 2024, the Rising People's Party (RPP) based in Nagaland, India accused factions of the National Socialist Council of Nagaland (NSCN), a Naga insurgent group active in Northeast India with headquarters in northern Sagaing Region, of having a "tacit understanding" with the military junta, helping with conscription and attacks on PDF's.

On 15 October 2024, the Anti-Fascist Internationalist Front officially formed to primarily train anti-junta forces in Chin State. A volunteer using the nom de guerre Azad served as an American volunteer for Kurdish forces in the Syrian Rojava conflict.. The group has expanded their operations, helping other Chin groups with drone R&D.

Foreign volunteers have also been documented in Karen State, with most being members of the humanitarian Free Burma Rangers organisation. While FBR members utilise weapons only for self-defence, some former associates have joined local rebel groups fighting the Tatmadaw, offering their expertise in many fields, such as drone technology, as is the case with the Federal Wings, a group that contributes to rebel drone R&D. The KNLA is also one of the few EAO's to accept foreign volunteers in their rankings, a tradition that dates back to the Cold War era in Myanmar.
