= Wrongful detention =

Detention without evidence or likelihood of crime, or without due process

Wrongful detention is the detention of an individual where there is no likelihood or evidence that they have committed a crime against a legal statute, or in which there has been no proper due process of law. A person does not need to be arrested in order to be wrongfully detained. Persons can be arbitrarily or wrongfully detained if they are not allowed to leave a specific jurisdiction (a type of travel ban known as an exit ban) or if they are prevented from traveling to or from a specific area or region.

== Distinction between hostages and false imprisonment ==
A wrongfully detained person is someone held by a government or state actor, often on questionable legal grounds, without the clear intention of using them as leverage to force another party to act. A hostage is typically someone seized and held against their will to pressure a third party into taking specific actions.

False imprisonment refers to a situation where someone is held by a government authority without legal justification, often in a government controlled setting like a police station or prison. Wrongful detention is a broader legal term encompassing any unlawful restraint of a person's movement where the detainer is a government entity acting without proper authority.

== International law ==
Arbitrarily depriving an individual of their liberty is prohibited under international human rights law. Article 9 of the 1948 Universal Declaration of Human Rights decrees that "no one shall be subjected to arbitrary arrest, detention or exile", that is, no individual, regardless of circumstances, is to be deprived of their liberty without having first committed an actual criminal offense against a legal statute, and a government cannot deprive an individual of their liberty without proper due process of law. The International Covenant on Civil and Political Rights specifies the protection from arbitrary detention by the Article 9.

== Laws and regulations by country ==
=== Australia ===
In 2024, a senate inquiry and report into the wrongful detention of Australian citizens overseas was tabled in parliament. The report recommended the adoption of a clear definition of wrongful detention, the passage of legislation to enable the government to respond to wrongful detentions, and the establishment of a Special Envoy for Wrongfully Detained Australians.

=== Canada ===
In November 2023, the designation of Senior Official for Hostage Affairs (SOHA) was established in order to lead Global Affairs Canada’s response to incidents of hostage-taking and wrongful detention of Canadian citizens abroad. The SOHA designation enables Canada to be more actively involved with officials with similar mandates in other governments.

=== United States ===
Wrongful detention is a codified legal determination made by the United States government that a United States national is imprisoned on false charges by a foreign government, often as a political hostage. Such a determination makes available substantial resources and authorities to aid in an individual's recovery, and to inform policymakers and family members of their status while detained. A determination of unlawful or wrongful detention is made by the Secretary of State in accordance with criteria set out in 22 U.S.C. § 1741.

Recovery efforts are managed by the U.S. government’s hostage recovery enterprise, which consists of the Special Presidential Envoy for Hostage Affairs at the Department of State, the Hostage Response Group at the National Security Council, and the interagency Hostage Recovery Fusion Cell, located at FBI headquarters.

American NGOs and nonprofit groups advocate for US citizens and other persons who are wrongfully detained or held hostage abroad, including the James W. Foley Legacy Foundation, Bring Our Families Home, and Hostage US.

==== Robert Levinson Hostage Recovery and Hostage-Taking Accountability Act (Levinson Act) 2020 ====
In response to the disappearance of Robert Levinson, in 2014 president Barack Obama ordered a review of the US policy on hostage taking. Following the conclusion of this review in 2015, he issued Executive Order 13698 (EO 13698) and Presidential Policy Directive 30 (PPD-30). These actions established the SPEHA, HRFC, and the Hostage Response Group (HRG). These groups were tasked with coordinating the secure release of US nationals who are being wrongfully detained or held hostage, support victim's families, and promote US national security interests.

The Levinson Act was then introduced in 2019, and passed into law in 2020 as 22 U.S.C. § 1741. The Act establishes a framework for determining what constitutes being “unlawfully or wrongfully detained”, codifies the establishment of the SPEHA, HRFC and the HRG, and creates the possibility of targeted sanctions for persons or foreign governments which have been found to wrongfully detain U.S. citizens or participate in hostage-taking.

==== U.S. Hostages and Wrongful Detainees Day ====
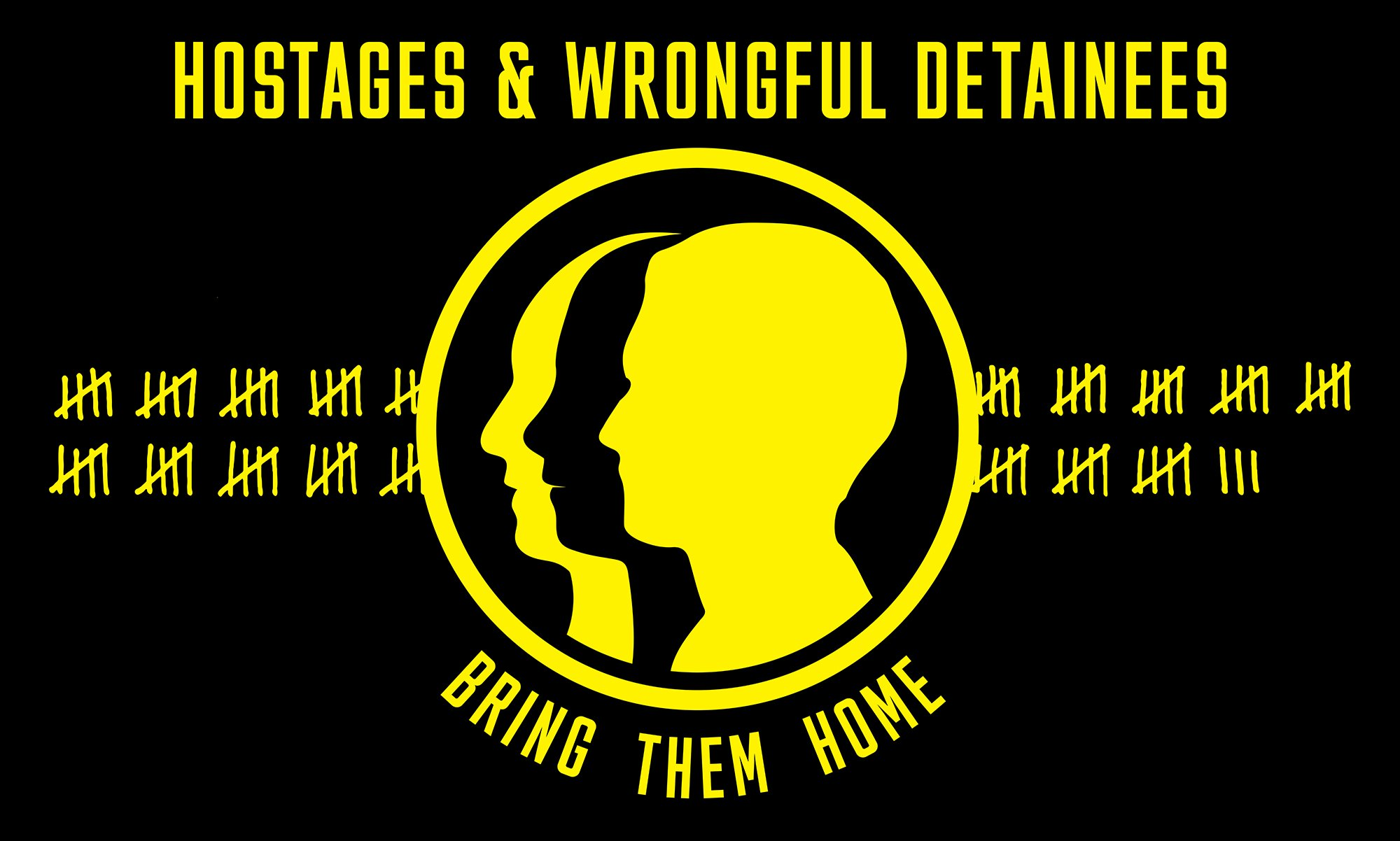
US Hostages & Wrongful Detainees Flag

U.S. Hostages and Wrongful Detainees Day is a federal holiday created in 2023 with the passage of the US Hostage and Wrongful Detainee Day Act. The holiday is observed on March 9th of every year. In addition to the designation of the federal holiday, the Act also designates and makes official the federally recognized flag of US Hostages and Wrongful Detainees. The flag was originally designed for the Bring Our Families Home campaign by University of Oregon professor David Ewald, in collaboration with family members of US hostages and wrongful detainees in the early 2020's. The first US Hostage and Wrongful Detainee Day was held on March 9, 2024 and marked with a flag raising ceremony on March 8, 2024 on the steps of the State Department headquarters in Washington D.C.

== See also ==
- Hostage diplomacy
- False imprisonment
- Travel ban
- Arbitrary arrest
- Detention (confinement)
- Migration diplomacy
- Fourth Geneva Convention
