= Hagr As Sai'ar district =

Hagr As Sai'ar District مديرية حجر الصيعر
- District
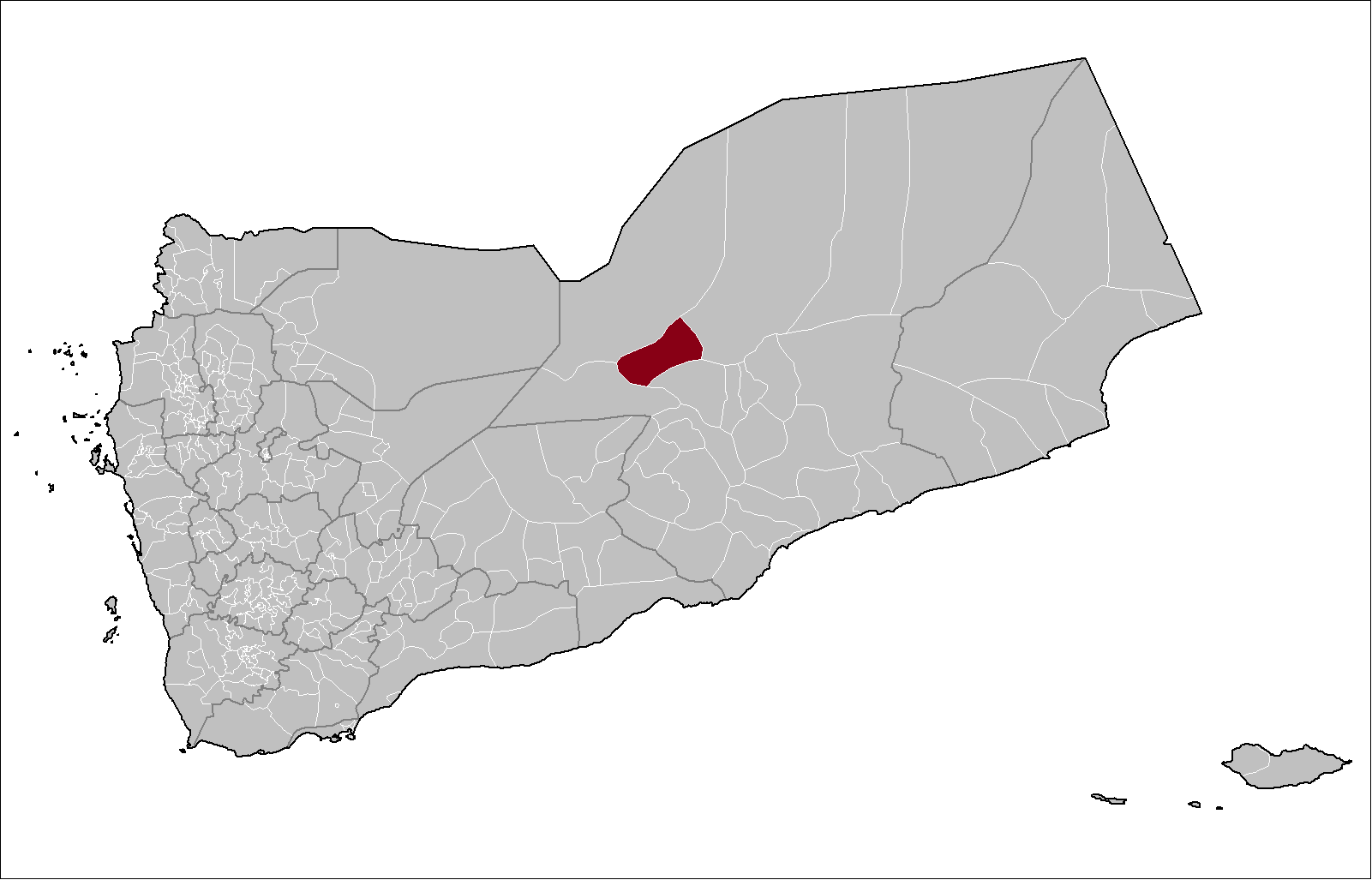
- The district highlighted in Yemen
- Coordinates: 16°25′N 48°25′E
- Country: Yemen
- Governorate: Hadhramaut

Population (2021)
  - Total: 3,911
- Time zone: UTC+3 (Yemen Standard Time)

Hagr As Sai'ar District (Arabic: مديرية حجر الصيعر) is a district of the Hadhramaut Governorate, Yemen. As of 2021, the district had a population of 3,911 inhabitants.
