= Jonathan Franks (advocate) =

Jonathan "Jon" Franks is an American advocate and public relations crisis consultant known for his work in securing the release of individuals held hostage or detained abroad. Franks has successfully advocated for the release of numerous Americans detained in various countries, working through public and private channels. Notable cases include: Andrew Tahmooressi, Michael White, Trevor Reed, Taylor Dudley, James Frisvold, Ridge Alkonis, Savoi Wright, among others. Franks provides commentary to the media on cases of Americans held hostage, and hostage diplomacy.

== Career ==
Before his hostage work, Franks worked in public relations and high-risk intervention with clients such as Montel Williams and James Woolsey.

In 2013, Franks advocated for the release of Andrew Tahmooressi, a U.S. Marine veteran detained in Mexico. Tahmooressi's case drew widespread media attention. In 2019, Franks was also involved in the case of Michael White, a U.S. Navy veteran detained in Iran. He served as a spokesperson for the family.

=== Trevor Reed campaign ===
After Trevor Reed's arrest, Franks began collaborating closely with his family. Together, they orchestrated high-profile protests, media campaigns, and garnered political support. This collective effort led to an Oval Office meeting with U.S. President Joe Biden and ultimately secured Reed's release from Russia in 2022.

=== Bring Our Families Home ===
Witnessing the success of Franks' approach, other families of detained Americans sought his assistance. Subsequently, Franks worked with these families to launch the Bring Our Families Home campaign merely a week after Reed's release. The daughter of one of the Citgo Six expressed the belief that her father would not have been released without Franks's assistance. U.S. Envoy for Hostage Affairs Roger D. Carstens thanked him for his role in a separate release from Venezuela. Neda Sharghi, the sister and advocate for Emad Shargi described Franks as a "game changer."

Franks is known for his role as the spokesperson for the Bring Our Families Home Campaign. As the spokesperson, Franks has highlighted the cases of Americans wrongfully detained overseas. The campaign aims to raise awareness, apply pressure on the U.S. Government, and mobilize public support to secure the release of detainees. He has publicly advocated for Paul Whelan, Evan Gershkovich, and Majd Kamalmaz.

=== Other cases ===
In 2023, Franks represented Taylor Dudley, an American Navy veteran, detained by Russia. Dudley was released in negotiations led by former New Mexico Governor Bill Richardson. Franks also worked on behalf of Naval Officer Ridge Alkonis, detained in Japan for a fatal car crash. Once transferred to the U.S., he advocated for Alkonis's release from Federal Bureau of Prisons custody.

In 2024, Franks advocated for an American detained in the Turks and Caicos Islands for illegal possession of ammunition. The man was subsequently allowed to return to the United States with a suspended sentence.
