= Take No Prisoners (film) =

Take No Prisoners is a 2025 American documentary film co-produced by Vanity Fair Studios and P3 Media. The film examines international hostage negotiations, focusing on Roger Carstens—the former U.S. Special Presidential Envoy for Hostage Affairs—and his efforts to secure the release of Americans held captive overseas. The documentary is based on a Vanity Fair article by Adam Ciralsky and is co-directed by Ciralsky and Subrata De. Bernice King was an executive producer. The film premiered at South by Southwest (SXSW) in 2025.

== Overview ==
The film provides access to the negotiation processes and behind-the-scenes operations involved in freeing American detainees, centering its narrative on the case of Eyvin Hernandez, a Los Angeles public defender held in Venezuela at the Casa de los Sueños and his subsequent release. It follows the family's and Carstens' efforts to secure his release. It explores both the emotional toll on affected families and the negotiations. Jason Rezaian, a former hostage, hosted a panel at South by Southwest to discuss the film. Screen Rant interviewed the producers at SXSW.

== Music ==
The film included singer David Nail's rendition of Bruce Cockburn's "Pacing The Cage." His performance was produced by Frank Liddell with contributions from musicians Harrison Whitford and Dustin Christensen. Nathan Matthew David produced the score for the film.

== Reception ==
Peter Martin, with Screen Anarchy, found it to be emotional while centering the suffering of Eyvin's family. Another reviewer also notes the emotional nature of the film and the access given to the filmmakers. Several reviews found that the film balanced the politics of hostage negotiations with the personal struggle of Hernandez's family.

Brian Tallerico wrote for RogerEbert.com that the film provides compelling behind-the-scenes look at U.S. hostage negotiations, showcasing both the emotional toll on families and the political complexities involved. However, he notes that the film hesitates to fully explore the contrast between high-powered government circles and the dire conditions of those in captivity. Cody Dericks criticized Take No Prisoners for its overly flattering portrayal of the U.S. government, avoiding deeper scrutiny of its actions and the delays in recognizing Hernandez as wrongfully imprisoned.

== Cast ==
- Roger Carstens, Special Presidential Envoy for Hostage Affairs
- Jake Sullivan, National Security Advisor (United States)
- Antony Blinken, United States Secretary of State
- Henry Martinez, Hernandez's brother
- Pedro Martinez, Hernandez's father
- Matthew Heath, American detained in Venezuela from 2020 - 2022
- Osman Khan, American detained in Venezuela for 259 days
- Drew Havens, Hernandez's friend
- Juan Sebastian Gonzalez, NSC Senior Director for the Western Hemisphere
- David Cotter, NSC Director for Counterterrorism
- Mickey Bergman, Richardson Center
- Joshua Geltzer, Homeland Security Advisor
