= Hugh Dugan =

American academic and diplomat

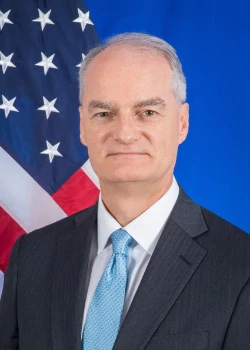

Acting Special Envoy for Hostage Affairs
- In office October 4, 2019 – March 1, 2020
- President: Donald Trump
- Preceded by: Robert C. O'Brien
- Succeeded by: Roger D. Carstens

Personal details
- Education: Georgetown University (BS); Tufts University (MA); University of Pennsylvania (MBA)

Hugh Dugan is an American academic and diplomat who served as the acting Special Presidential Envoy for Hostage Affairs from October 4, 2019 to March 1, 2020.

== Education ==
Dugan earned a Bachelor of Science in Foreign Service BSFS from the School of Foreign Service at Georgetown University, Master of Arts in Law and Diplomacy MALD from the Fletcher School of Law and Diplomacy of Tufts University Administered with the Cooperation of Harvard University, and the Masters of Business Administration MBA from the Wharton School of the University of Pennsylvania where he attended as a US State Department Fellow. He has a post-graduate certificate from the International Olympic Academy in Olympia, Greece. Other studies include: The Catholic University of America, The University of Wisconsin, and The City University of New York: Dugan was a member of the national championship debate team while at Marquette University High School (Milwaukee).

== Career ==
During Dugan's career in the United States Foreign Service, he served as US Delegate and Senior Advisor to eleven United States Ambassadors to the United Nations. After the September 11 attacks, he was detailed to the United States Senate Committee on Foreign Relations to advise on US policy and participation at the UN. Dugan previously served in the US Department of State's Bureau of Economic and Business Affairs, the American Consulate General in Bermuda, and the Embassy of the United States, Mexico City. Dugan is Senior Fellow at the Center for UN and Global Governance Studies in the School of Diplomacy and International Relations at Seton Hall University. There he served as Sharkey Distinguished Visiting Scholar and professor from August 2015 to December 2018.

From January 28, 2019 to April 27, 2020, Dugan served as the Principal Deputy Special Envoy for Hostage Affairs. He concurrently served as acting Special Envoy from October 2019 to March 2020. In February 2020, Trump appointed Dugan to serve as a member of the United States National Security Council.

Dugan is the founder of the Truce Foundation, a non-profit organization based in Princeton, New Jersey that advocates for fostering diplomatic relationships through sport, modeled after the Olympic Truce.
