= United States v. Ji Chaoqun =

2024 U.S. Seventh Circuit Court case on the Foreign Agents Registration Act

- Court: United States Court of Appeals for the Seventh Circuit
- Full case name: United States of America v. Ji Chaoqun
- Argued: April 3, 2024
- Decided: July 10, 2024
- Citation: 107 F.4th 715

Case history
- Prior history: Appeal from N.D. Ill.

Holding
- A jury need not unanimously decide which act a foreign agent committed when charged with violating 18 U.S.C. § 951 and the legal commercial transaction exception is an affirmative defense but not an element of the defense.

Court membership
- Judges sitting: Amy J. St. Eve, Thomas Kirsch, John Z. Lee

Case opinions
- Majority: Amy J. St. Eve

Laws applied
- 18 U.S.C. § 951

United States v. Ji Chaoqun, 107 F.4th 715 (7th Cir. 2024), is a decision by the United States Court of Appeals for the Seventh Circuit concerning 18 U.S.C. § 951, a criminal statute that imposes fines and imprisonment on agents of foreign governments who fail to register as such with the U.S. Department of Justice. The court ruled that a jury does not need to unanimously decide which specific act a foreign agent committed when charged under the statute and that the legal commercial transaction exception in 18 U.S.C. § 951(d)(4) serves as an affirmative defense, not an element of the offense.

== Background ==
Ji Chaoqun, a Chinese national, was a student of electrical engineering at the Illinois Institute of Technology in Chicago, Illinois, from 2013. He was arrested in Chicago in September 2018, and indicted in January 2019. In May 2022. he was charged with conspiring to commit an offense against or defraud the United States in violation of 18 U.S.C. § 371, failing to register as a foreign agent in violation of 18 U.S.C. § 951(a), two counts of wire fraud in violation of 18 U.S.C. § 1343, and making a materially false statement in violation of 18 U.S.C. § 1001(a)(2).

According to the criminal complaint, Ji was recruited by and worked under the direction of China's Jiangsu State Security Department (JSSD), a division of the Ministry of State Security (MSS). Ji was tasked to provide biographical information on eight Chinese nationals working as engineers and scientists in the United States, some of whom were employed by U.S. defense contractors, for potential recruitment by the JSSD.

In June 2016, Ji enlisted in the U.S. Army Reserves through the Military Accessions Vital to the National Interest (MAVNI) program. In 2018, he told an FBI undercover agent that he had received cash from MSS officers and planned to seek jobs with top-secret clearance, including positions at the CIA, FBI, and NASA, among other U.S. government agencies.

== District court ruling ==
The United States District Court for the Northern District of Illinois held the trial in September 2022. Evidence presented during the two-week trial showed that Ji had been recruited by the Chinese Ministry of State Security before leaving China and had engaged in various activities on its behalf, including purchasing background reports on U.S. scientists and attempting to infiltrate the U.S. Army Reserves.

Ji argued that the legal commercial transaction exception in § 951(d)(4), which excludes "any person engaged in a legal commercial transaction" from the definition of a "foreign agent," applied to his case. However, the district court found that this exception only covered legal commercial relationships and that Ji's relationship with China extended beyond that of engaging in a legal commercial transaction.

The jury found Ji guilty of failing to register as a foreign agent in violation of 18 U.S.C. § 951(a) along with other charges. The court convicted him accordingly. He was acquitted on two charges of wire fraud.

In January 2023, the district court denied Ji's motions for a judgment of acquittal and for a new trial. He was subsequently sentenced to 96 months in prison in January 2023.

== Circuit court ruling ==
Ji appealed the district court's conviction and sentencing to the Seventh Circuit. The case was argued on April 3, 2024. In July 2024, the Seventh Circuit affirmed the conviction and sentence.

On appeal, Ji argued that the government was required to prove he was not engaged in a legal commercial transaction as part of the 18 U.S.C. § 951(a) offense and that the jury should have been required to unanimously agree on the specific act he committed. Ji also challenged the district court's evidentiary and sentencing decisions.

In its July 2024 decision, the Seventh Circuit held that a jury need not unanimously agree on which specific act was committed under § 951, stating that a § 951 violation does not turn on the nature of the act. "Instead, it turns on whether the action was taken on behalf of a foreign government and without prior notice to the United States." The court concluded that the specific act taken on behalf of a foreign government under § 951 is a means, not an element, and therefore a jury need not unanimously decide which act the Ji performed to find him guilty.

The Seventh Circuit further ruled that the legal commercial transaction exception in 18 U.S.C. § 951(d) is an affirmative defense rather than an element of the offense. The appellate court also found no errors in the district court's evidentiary rulings or its sentencing decisions.

Ji was released in November 2024 as part of a prisoner swap for three Americans, Mark Swidan, Kai Li, and John Leung, who were detained in China for years. Also released was Xu Yanjun, an officer of China's Ministry of State Security.
