= Roger D. Carstens =

American diplomat

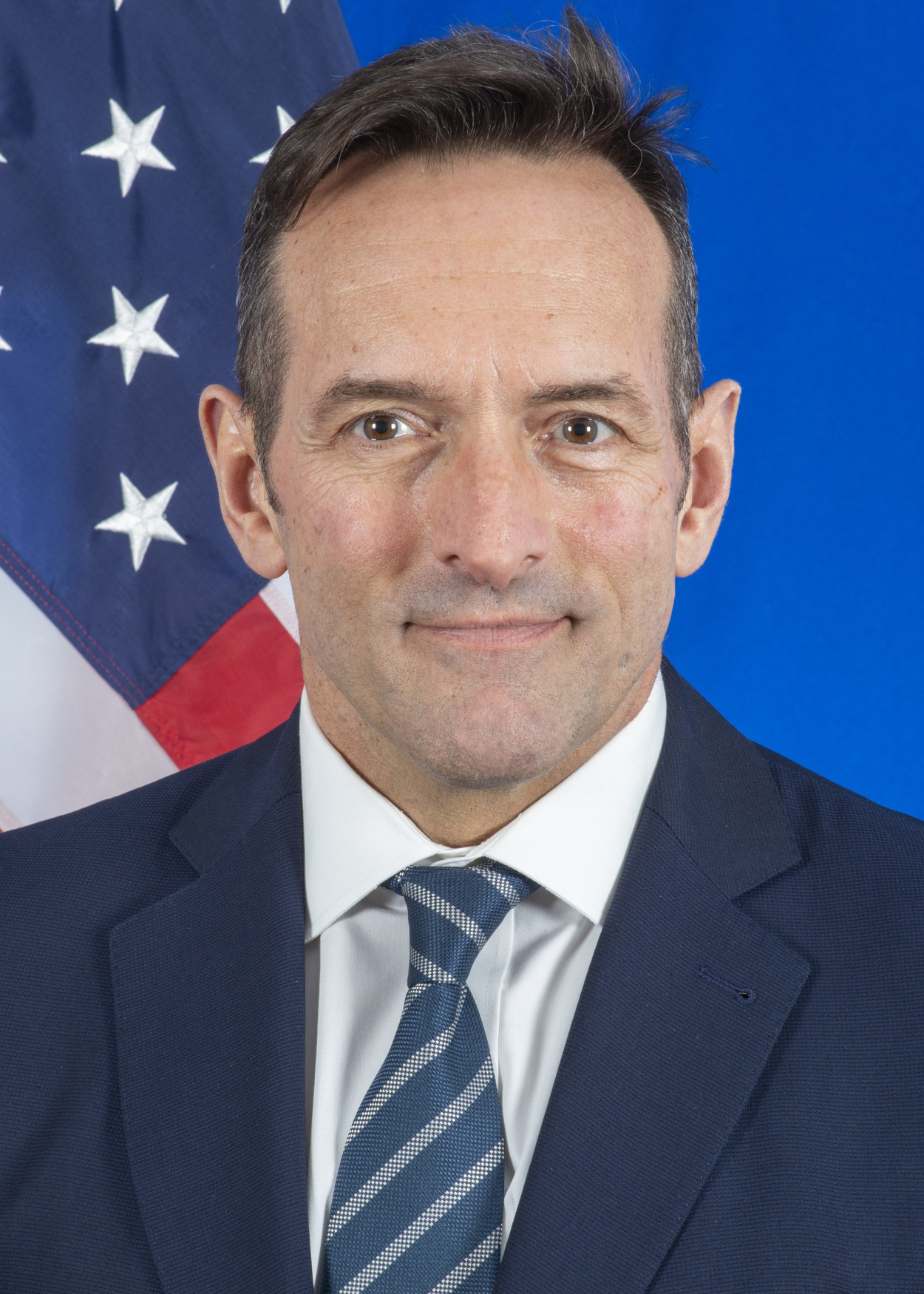

3rd Special Envoy for Hostage Affairs
- In office March 1, 2020 – January 20, 2025
- President: Donald Trump; Joe Biden
- Preceded by: Robert C. O'Brien
- Succeeded by: Adam Boehler

Personal details
- Born: Roger Dean Carstens
- Education: United States Military Academy (BS); Naval War College (MA); St. John's College (MA)

Military service
- Allegiance: United States
- Branch/service: United States Army
- Rank: Lieutenant Colonel
- Unit: United States Army Special Forces
- Battles/wars: Iraq War

Roger Dean Carstens is an American diplomat and retired United States Army Special Forces lieutenant colonel. Carstens served as the Special Presidential Envoy for Hostage Affairs (SPEHA) from 2020 to 2025.

Raised in Spokane, Washington, Carstens graduated from United States Military Academy in West Point, New York, where he was class president for the Class of 1986. After graduation, he went on to attend United States Army Ranger School.

Carstens served as a special forces military officer for much of his time in the Army. He also served as a legislative liaison at the Department of Defense and for the United States Special Operations Command.

Carstens has served two U.S. Presidents at the United States Department of State. He was the deputy assistant secretary in the Bureau of Democracy, Human Rights, and Labor in the Trump administration. He has served as the special presidential envoy for hostage affairs since 2020 in the First presidency of Donald Trump. Carstens was one of the few political appointees that President Joe Biden elected to keep in place.

During his work as the Special Presidential Envoy for Hostage Affairs, Carstens has negotiated the release of over a dozen Americans wrongfully detained or held hostage abroad including Brittney Griner, Paul Whelan, Emad Shargi, Evan Gershkovich, Eyvin Hernandez, Philip Walton, Trevor Reed, Danny Fenster, Baquer Namazi, the Citgo Six, Osman Khan, Matthew John Heath, Mark Frerichs, and Jorge Alberto Fernández. Carstens, under the Biden administration, negotiated the release of 58 Americans.

Carstens has attended events with and supported the Bring Our Families Home campaign. Carstens' work in SPEHA was highlighted in the 2025 documentary film Take No Prisoners.

== Early life and education ==
Roger Carstens grew up in Spokane, Washington, and graduated from University High School (Washington) in 1982. Carstens went on to earn a Bachelor of Science degree in diplomatic and strategic history from the United States Military Academy in 1986. Carstens was class president at West Point and became interested in joining the military after reading about injustices around the world including the Cambodian genocide.

Carstens later earned a Master of Arts degree in national security and strategic studies from the Naval War College in 2002 and a Master of Arts in liberal arts from St. John's College in 2016.

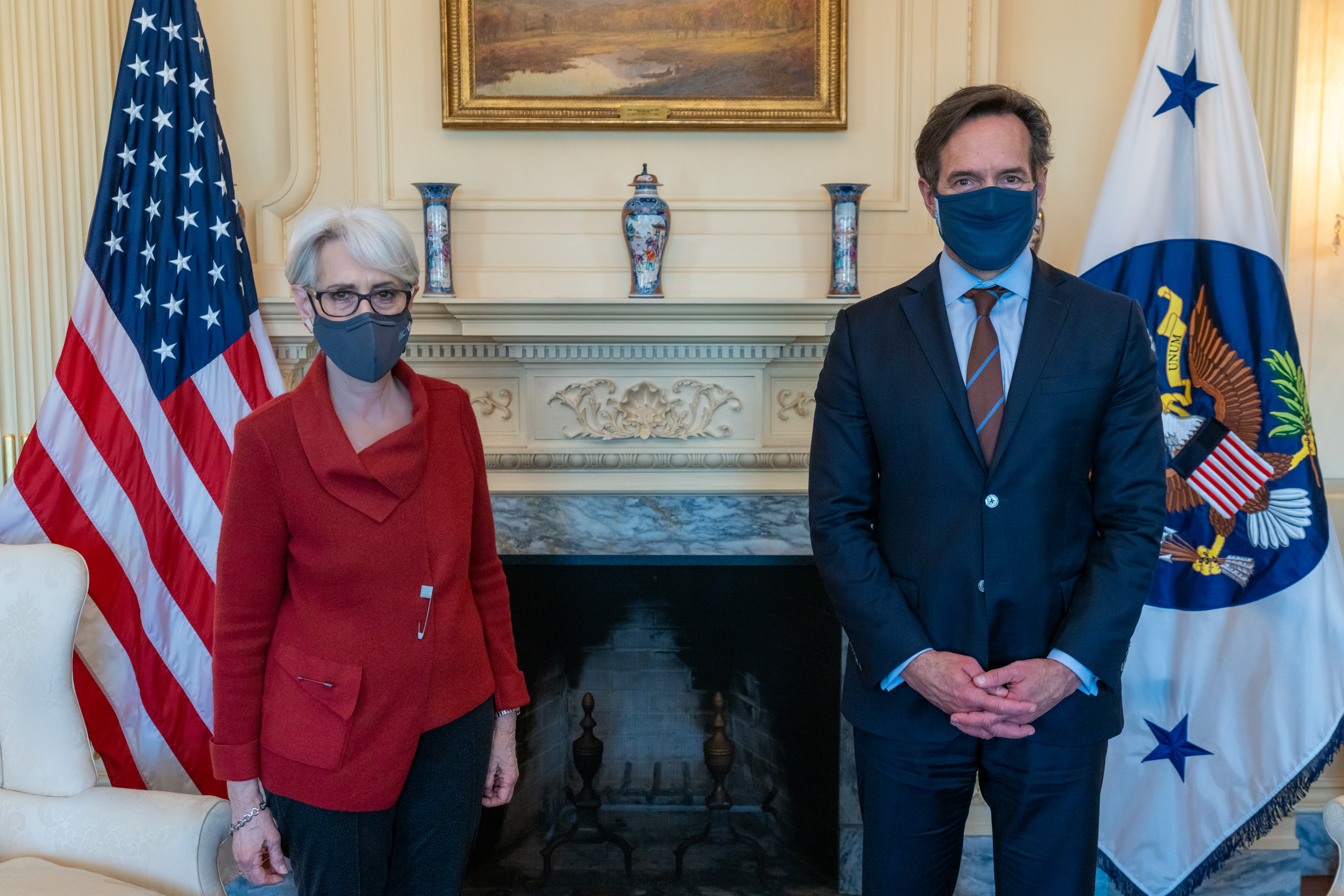
Carstens meets with Deputy Secretary of State Wendy R. Sherman at the U.S. Department of State in Washington, D.C., on April 26, 2021.

== Career ==
=== United States Army ===
During his time with the Army, Carstens earned the rank of Lieutenant Colonel in the United States Army Special Forces. Carstens served in six different operations/wars: United States invasion of Panama, Kosovo War, Bosnian War, War in Afghanistan (2001–2021), Iraq War, and Somali Civil War, and thirteen different military locations.

During the 1990s, Carstens trained for years to conduct rescue operations as a special forces officer. Carstens served as Company Commander of the Special Forces Qualification Course at the U.S. Army's Special Forces School.

He also acted as an advisor to the Iraqi National Counter Terror Force and a senior civilian advisor to the International Security Assistance Force. After completing a tour in Iraq, he served as a legislative liaison for the United States Secretary of Defense.

Daniel Pinéu, a professor at Amsterdam University College, wrote that Carstens is the embodiment of the phrase "an officer and a gentleman."

=== Fellowships ===
In 2003, Carstens was selected as a finalist for the White House Fellows program.

After leaving the military, Carstens was a Senior Fellow for the Center for a New American Security. He has also worked as a fellow for the New America Foundation.

=== Commander's Advisory and Assistance Team ===
Carstens served as Senior Civilian Advisor on the Commander's Advisory and Assistance Team in Afghanistan from 2009 to 2011. He advised on counterinsurgency. General David Petraeus praised Carstens for his work.

=== International Non-Governmental Organizations (INGOs) ===
Carstens helped train local Somali National Army and African Union Mission to Somalia security forces in Somalia through his work with Bancroft Global Development. He has also worked for an NGO that delivered humanitarian aid from Jordan into southern Syria.

=== Bureau of Democracy, Human Rights, and Labor ===
Carstens previously served as the deputy assistant secretary in the Bureau of Democracy, Human Rights, and Labor. In 2019, Carstens condemned the human rights crisis occurring in Nicaragua. He also advocated, among other things, to protect the human rights of women in Syria in the midst of the Syrian civil war.

=== Special Presidential Envoy for Hostage Affairs ===
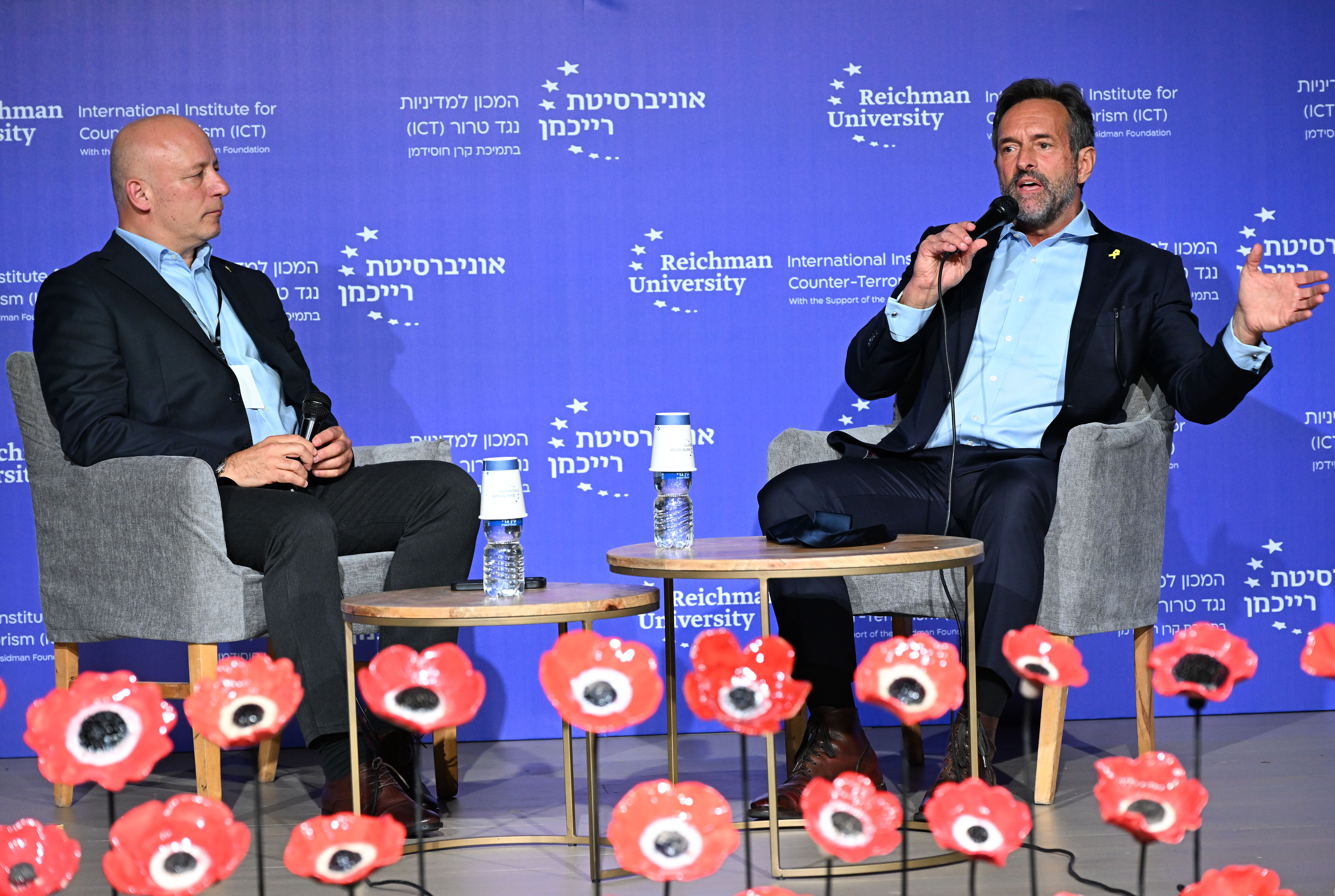
Carstens at the World Summit on Counterterrorism, Reichman University, October 2024

In 2020, President Donald Trump appointed Carstens as the Special Presidential Envoy for Hostage Affairs. He has prioritized building infrastructure in the hostage recovery process.

Jason Rezaian, a journalist and former wrongful detainee in Iran, wrote an op-ed asking President Biden to keep Carstens in his position. Carstens was one of the few political appointees that President Joe Biden elected to keep in place.

Family members of Americans held hostage told Yahoo! News that Carstens has been a "relentless advocate" for hostages and their families. In a 2021 report by the James Foley Foundation, family members praised Carstens's dedication: "Ambassador Carstens made himself available to us saying if we need anything that we could call or email him at any time. There have been times where we’ve had to call and ask for help. It's much better … [we] feel like he's really there for the families.”

Carstens supported President Biden's executive order that seeks to help American's unlawfully detained abroad and prevent such wrongful detentions. He told NPR "I think overall the sanction tool is going to offer a chance to deter people in the long term when they see it being used. But whether it's going to specifically be the spring that gets Brittney Griner, Paul Whelan free—that is yet to be seen."

==== Afghanistan ====
In 2022, Carstens negotiated the release of Mark Frerichs as a part of a prisoner exchange for Bashir Noorzai.

==== Iran ====
Carstens has engaged in indirect conversations with Iranian officials to secure the release of Americans being held by the Iranian government.

==== Myanmar ====
In 2021, Carstens, along with former New Mexico governor Bill Richardson, assisted in the release of American journalist Danny Fenster. Carstens appeared on 60 Minutes to discuss his involvement in the case.

==== Nigeria ====
Carstens assisted in the 2020 Nigeria hostage rescue mission of Philip Walton. Walton had been kidnapped from his home in Southern Niger by an armed group and taken to Nigeria.

==== Russia ====
In April 2022, Carstens negotiated the release of Trevor Reed as part of a prisoner exchange for Konstantin Yaroshenko, a Russian pilot convicted of drug smuggling. President Biden praised Carstens for his work to secure the release of Reed. He has also worked to secure the release of Paul Whelan and WNBA star Brittney Griner. He was involved in the negotiations and coordination that resulted in the 2024 prisoner swap between Russia and the United States.

==== Syria ====
Carstens travelled to Syria during the first presidency of Donald Trump to try to negotiate for the release of Austin Tice and Majd Kamalmaz. The Assad regime denied holding Tice. In an interview with CBS News in Amman, following the fall of the Assad regime, he called Bashar al-Assad's secret jails "horrifying and disturbing, yet in a way fascinating."

==== Venezuela ====
Carstens has helped negotiate the release of nine Americans from Venezuela during his time as the head of hostage affairs. In March 2022, he negotiated the release of Gustavo Cárdenas, a member of the Citgo Six and also American Jorge Alberto Fernández. In October 2022, Carstens negotiated a prisoner exchange that resulted in the release of seven Americans, including the remaining five of the Citgo Six, Matthew John Heath, and Osman Khan. Carstens also helped negotiate the release of ten additional Americans in December 2023.

=== Media Projects ===
Carstens appeared in The Project, a documentary film that documents Carstens's works as a contracted military advisor to support the Somali people in their efforts to combat the rise of piracy off the coast of Somalia. Carstens was featured in NBC's The Wanted as an expert in counterterrorism.

== Books ==
- Cooling the Streets: Institutional Reforms in Iraq's Ministry of Interior (2008)
- Changing the Culture of Pentagon Contracting (2008)
