= Matthew John Heath =

American military officer and security consultant (born 1981)

Matthew John Heath (born 1981) is an honorably discharged U.S. Marine Corps veteran, security consultant, and commentator. He took part in the early battles of the Iraq War and was highly decorated for actions taken in the Battle of Nasiriyah. Heath specialized in communication and signals intelligence. After leaving the military in 2004, he began work as a security consultant for the U.S. Govt. On September 9, 2020, Heath was arrested by the government of Venezuela and subsequently charged with offenses related to treason, terrorism and arms trafficking. Following his arrest, his family engaged in a public advocacy campaign in order to secure his release from Venezuela.

== Post military career ==
After leaving the Marine Corps, Heath worked for the U.S. State Department on the Central Poppy Eradication Program throughout Afghanistan. On August 29, 2004, the Taliban targeted Heath at his home with a suicide VBIED that killed seven, but narrowly avoided killing its intended target. Taliban spokesman Abdul Latif Hakimi claimed full knowledge of the attack and said "The Islamic Emirate of Afghanistan takes full responsibility". President Hamid Karzai issued a statement regarding the blast.

Prosecutor General Tarek William Saab claims Heath worked for MVM, Inc., a private security contracting firm with ties to the Central Intelligence Agency and National Security Agency, from 2006 until 2016.

In early 2020 Heath had purchased a small 53 foot trawler hulled yacht with plans to start a charter business in the Caribbean. Heath is currently an independent security consultant with Secure Horizons. Heath has regularly been interviewed in print for his opinions on Wrongful Detainment of U.S. citizens and his views on U.S. Venezuela relations.

== Incident and arrest ==
In March 2020 Heath had set sail in the Caribbean on a small ship called the "Purple Dream", and sailed to Nicaragua and Colombia. He was arrested in Colombia after being found with two handgun magazines at a checkpoint. He allegedly traveled to Venezuela in an attempt to return home to the United States but was arrested on September 9, 2020. Heath was charged by the Prosecutor General of Venezuela, Tarek William Saab, with Treason, Terrorism and Arms Trafficking. Venezuelan authorities claim to have arrested him while in possession of an AT4 rocket launcher, an Uzi sub-machine gun, C-4 explosives, pictures of a nearby oil refinery, and large amounts of foreign currency. His lawyer has called the charges against him falsified. Additionally, Heath was imprisoned in El Helicoide prison (infamous for alleged torture) and his family accused the Venezuelan government of torturing him.

In a nationally televised address, Venezuelan Attorney General Tarek Saab labeled Heath a "spy" and "mercenary" and accused him plotting attacks against Venezuela's oil industry and electricity system. Saab stated that Venezuelan security services had neutralized an operation that "could have been one of the worst in recent times" and that Heath "was found carrying out espionage activities to destabilize Venezuelan territory ... (Heath) had the help of Venezuelan citizens, both military and civilian." Venezuelan President Nicolás Maduro announced Heath's capture and alleged Heath was spying on the country's Amuay Refinery and Cardon refineries. Maduro Alleged Heath was captured carrying "specialized weapons, communications equipment" and large amounts of cash. President Maduro alleged heath was a CIA operative.

Senior U.S. Government officials reject claims that they sent Heath to Venezuela. The Central Intelligence Agency declined to comment. The United States Marine Corps simply confirmed that a man matching Heath's name "served in the Corps from 1999 until 2003" but could neither confirm nor deny that the man arrested in Venezuela was the same man. In February 2021, Venezuelan judicial authorities ordered that a trial begin for Heath. The U.S. State Department called upon the Venezuelan government to provide a fair hearing for Heath.

== Support from the U.S. Govt. ==
While the CIA declined to comment on the case and other senior officials rejected Venezuelan claims that Heath was sent by the U.S. Govt, Heath received broad support from other high-ranking officials. Senior Advisor to the Secretary of State Ned Price, Assistant Secretary of State Brian A. Nichols, Ambassador Roger D. Carstens, and Secretary of State Antony Blinken all at various times released statements calling for his immediate release from Venezuelan captivity. Heath's support was not confined to the U.S. State Department. Congressman Chuck Fleischmann, Senator Bill Hagerty, and Senator Ted Cruz called for Heath's "immediate and unconditional release". National Security Advisor Jake Sullivan office personally handled Heath's case, and was in contact with Heath's family throughout his detainment. President Joe Biden was briefed on Heath's case as circumstances required. Upon Heaths release President Joe Biden released a statement affirming Heath's wrongful detention and celebrating his reuniting with his family.

== Release ==
On October 1, 2022, Heath was released as part of a prisoner swap between the United States and Venezuela. The swap saw Heath and six other Americans exchanged for the two nephews, Francisco Flores de Freitas and Efraín Antonio Campo Flores (Narcosobrinos), of Venezuelan President Nicolas Maduro's wife. Both Freitas and Flores had been found guilty of attempting to smuggle 800 kilos of Cocaine into the United States. President Biden released a statement celebrating Heaths return. On October 18, 2022, Heath's hometown threw him a parade to celebrate his end of captivity, attended by the local fire department and school children from the elementary, middle, and high schools. Deputy Homeland Security Adviser Joshua Geltzer issued a statement on behalf of NSA Sullivan celebrating Heath's return to the USA.

Heath's family is a founding part of the Bring Our Families Home campaign which advocates to bring home wrongful detainees and hostages. Heath's image is featured in a 15-foot mural in Georgetown (Washington, D.C.) along with other Americans wrongfully detained abroad.

== Views ==
Heath has criticized the government of Venezuela for its corruption and lack of judicial independence. Heath has also regularly spoken to the press about other wrongful detainees such as former Marine Austin Tice, Emad Shargi, and others.

== See also ==
- Narcosobrinos affair
- Citgo Six
- Operation Gideon (2020)
- Political prisoners in Venezuela
