= Sebastián González =

Sebastián González may refer to:

- Sebastián González Vázquez (born 1956), Spanish lawyer and politician
- Sebastian González (footballer, born 1978), Chilean footballer
- Sebastián González (footballer, born 1992), Argentine footballer
- Sebastián González (footballer, born 2003), Ecuadorian footballer

== See also ==
- Sebastián (sculptor) (Enrique Carbajal González, born 1947), Mexican sculptor
- Juan Sebastian Gonzalez, Colombian-American government official
- Sebastián Gonzales (born 1999), Peruvian footballer
