= Mark Swidan =

American detained in China

Mark Swidan is an American designer, artist, photographer and businessman from Houston, Texas. He was detained in China from 2012 to 2024. In 2019, Swidan was charged with drug trafficking in China and sentenced to death with a two-year reprieve by a court in Guangdong. on April 14, 2023, the Guangdong court upheld the sentence. The U.S. government and the UN Working Group on Arbitrary Detention considered Swidan wrongfully detained. He was released on November 27, 2024, as part of a prisoner swap with China.

== Detention and sentence ==
In 2012, Swidan traveled to China to buy supplies such as furniture, flooring, fixtures and helium for his home and business. On November 14, he was arrested in a Dongguan, Guangzhou, hotel room while speaking with his family on the phone. Eleven other people from Canada, China, Mexico, and the United States were arrested during the same operation.

Swidan was accused of narcotics-related charges and trafficking drugs in China. The authorities allegedly tried to make Swidan sign a confession of drug possession, but he refused. A year later, he was tried in a Jiangmen intermediate people's court in Guangdong.

The verdict in the case was delayed for years. In accordance with Chinese laws, U.S. consulate personnel visited him every month in the presence of Chinese judicial officers, but were not allowed to discuss facts related to his case that could obstruct the trial.

After five and a half years, Swidan was sentenced to death. At the time of his sentencing, U.S. treasury secretary Steven Mnuchin was in China to discuss the ongoing trade war between the U.S. and China.

=== Prison conditions ===
Swidan was held at Jiangmen Prison, which the Dui Hua Foundation has called a "black box". During his time there, he was not allowed to call his family members or send them mail. He reportedly went on multiple hunger strikes and attempted suicide multiple times.

In a July 2022 interview, Swidan's mother, Katherine Swidan, said she had not spoken to him since a five-minute phone call in 2018. In November 2022, Politico reported that Chinese officials, citing the country’s zero-Covid strategy, had denied Swidan in-person visits from U.S. consular officials for more than a year.

Attorney Jason Poblete said of Swidan's detention: "This man has not slept in a dark room in almost 10 years. They have not turned the lights off. He has been kept in a very small cell. He has been forced and subjected to extreme psychological pressure and pains."

Katherine Swidan reported that her son's health had been deteriorating. She told CBS that guards broke her son's hand five to seven times, he had dislocated his knee, and he suffered from periodontal disease. It was also reported that Swidan has lost 100 pounds while confined. His mother reported that he was forced to beg for food and to produce silk flowers while exposed to toxic chemicals. Katherine Swidan told The Guardian: "Mark is in a center that is caged with probably 25 other people. There's a hole in the ground for a toilet. They ration toilet paper. There's no hot water, even in the winter. He told me: 'Mama, I've never been so cold in my life'". In the summer, temperatures at the prison can reach 110 degrees Fahrenheit with no air conditioning.

== Responses ==
=== United States ===
During the Obama administration, neither the White House nor the State Department made statements or remarks on the case. Administration officials told Newsweek that little could be done.

The Biden administration considered Swidan wrongfully detained. Special Presidential Envoy for Hostage Affairs Roger D. Carstens made it a priority to secure Swidan's release. National Security Advisor Jake Sullivan raised Swidan's wrongful detention with top Chinese diplomat Yang Jiechi as a personal priority for President Joe Biden.

U.S. Ambassador to China R. Nicholas Burns wrote to Katherine Swidan to tell her that securing her son's release was an urgent priority for the White House, the State Department and the U.S. Embassy in China, but she said that the U.S. government was not doing enough to secure her son's release.

Senator Ted Cruz and Representative Michael Cloud introduced a resolution to support Swidan's release. Vicente Gonzalez also advocated for his release.

In 2022, the U.S. State Department issued a travel advisory for China, noting "arbitrary enforcement of local laws for purposes other than maintaining law and order, including the use of exit bans". The U.S. government signed an executive order aimed at sanctioning government and individuals who wrongfully detain Americans abroad.

U.S. organizations condemned Swidan's detention and death sentence.

=== China and the United Nations ===
In its submission to the United Nations Working Group on Arbitrary Detention, the Chinese government said Swidan was the principal offender in a drug trafficking scheme, citing his contact with two groups of narcotics producers, facilitating their arrival to China, providing assistance at the drug-manufacturing site where they worked, and transferring money to them. It said large amounts of meth (63,833.92 grams) and dimethylamphetamine (365.9 grams) were seized at locations where Swidan manufactured, trafficked and sold the drugs. It said Swidan did not deny his involvement in the scheme, citing a confession of guilt he made during the investigation stage of the case, a personal account he wrote about his involvement in the production of drugs and information he provided about the crimes his co-defendants committed. It also said Swidan's rights to meet and communicate with his consul and rights to a defence had been upheld.

In response, the Working Group said Swidan's detention was wrongful and called for him to be immediately released with an enforceable right to compensation. It said Swidan's arrest and detention had no legal basis as he was not presented with an arrest warrant at the time of his arrest or promptly informed of the charges against him. It said Swidan's due process rights to a fair trial were violated as he did not enjoy full and complete access to legal counsel and consular assistance before and during the trial. It also expressed concern over the nature and conditions of his detention, the length of his trial, and the severity of his punishment.

=== Private individuals and organizations ===
Katherine Swidan advocated for her son's release for years. She joined the Bring Our Families Home Campaign, which advocated for the return of wrongful detainees and hostages. Swidan's image was featured in a 15-foot mural in Washington, D.C., along with other Americans wrongfully detained abroad.

Professor Donald C. Clarke, an expert in Chinese law, said that a long verdict delay could be because of an internal controversy within the judicial system, with actors questioning the case's merits. Clarke said, "In such cases, the court doesn't want to embarrass police and prosecutors by acquitting, but it is also reluctant to convict, so it just sits on the case."

Peter William Humphrey, who was arrested in China for allegedly illegally acquiring personal data, called Swidan's detention a case of hostage diplomacy.

In 2014, Swidan shared a cell with Terry Lee, an Australian-educated Chinese businessman who claimed he was jailed for refusing to pay a bribe. Lee became convinced of Swidan's innocence despite pleas from the warden to spy on Swidan.

The Dui Hua Foundation advocated Swidan's release. John Kamm, its chairman, wrote to the Chinese government about Swidan's detention 40 times and received three or four responses. He told the Washington Examiner, "The situation is so bad that Chinese officials have admitted to me how embarrassed they are by what has happened." "I have never seen such a violation of an individual's due process rights", he added.

Kamm said that no forensic evidence linked Swidan to a drug transaction or conspiracy. He told Newsweek, "the only 'evidence' against him is that Swidan once visited a factory where Chinese authorities allege the meth was manufactured, and that he had been in a room rented by another person where drugs were found." Kamm added that there was "no fingerprints, no DNA, no drugs in his system. Nor has evidence been presented of his 'coordinating' role—no emails, no logs of calls, etc. I am convinced that Mr. Swidan is innocent."

== Release ==
In November 2024, Mark Swidan was released from his detention along with two other American citizens as part of a prisoner swap with China.
