= William P. Alford =

United States legal scholar (born 1948)

William Philip Alford
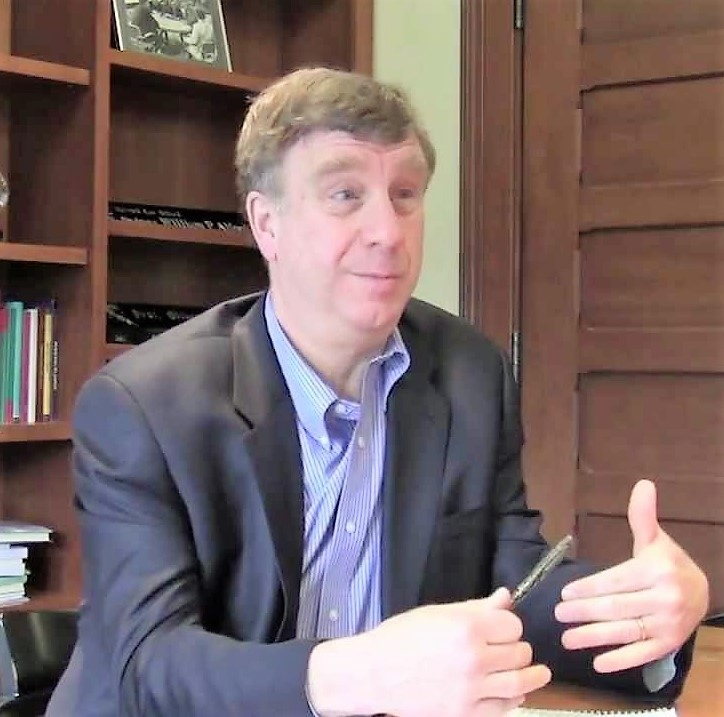
- Alford speaks on the Future of Legal Education in 2012
- Born: November 26, 1948 (age 77); Massachusetts, U.S.
- Education: Amherst College (BA); University of Cambridge (LLB); Yale University (MA, MA); Harvard University (JD)
- Occupations: law professor, educator, author, academic, Chinese law specialist
- Spouse: Yuanyuan Shen (m. 1991)
- Children: 2

William P. Alford (Chinese: 安守廉; pinyin: Ān Shǒulián; born November 26, 1948) is an American legal scholar and sinologist. He is the Henry L. Stimson Professor of Law at Harvard University, where he is also the vice dean for the graduate program of international legal studies at Harvard Law School and the director of its East Asian legal studies program. He is an expert in the field of Chinese law.

He is an honorary professor of Renmin University, Zhejiang University and the China National School of Administration, and an Honorary Fellow of the American Studies Institute of the Department of Law of the Chinese Academy of Social Sciences. He directed the China Center for American Law Study, the first academic program in U.S. law in the PRC, was a founder in 1982 of the U.S. Committee on Legal Education Exchange with China, is the recipient of a number of awards and fellowships for his work on China, and is on a host of advisory and editorial boards.

== Biography ==
William Alford was born on November 26, 1948, in Massachusetts to the physician Dr. Hyman Alford and Rose Alford. He has a sister, Nancy Ruth Alford Wine, a corporate banker.

Alford received his B.A. degree from Amherst College in 1970 and LL.B. degree from the University of Cambridge in 1972. He received two Master of Arts in Chinese Studies and Chinese history from Yale University in 1974 and 1975, respectively, and a J.D. from Harvard Law School in 1977.

Alford was a law professor at UCLA before taking a position at Harvard Law School.

Alford has been involved in China's legal reform since the early 1980s. In 1982, with Professor Randle Edwards, then of Columbia University, he co-founded the U.S. Committee on Legal Education Exchange with China, the first national exchange program to bring Chinese students to the United States for legal education. He also directed the China Center for American Law Study, the first academic program in the People's Republic of China focused on American law.

Alford has served as a consultant to the U.S. government, the Chinese government, multilateral organizations, foundations, civic groups, NGOs, law firms, and businesses on issues including trade, human rights, intellectual property, and legal education.

From 2005 to 2014, he served on the board of directors of Special Olympics International, chairing its Research and Policy Committee and serving on its Executive Committee. He is the founding Chair of the Harvard Law School Project on Disability, which provides pro bono services on disability issues in China, Bangladesh, the Philippines, Vietnam, and other nations. In 2008, Special Olympics honored him for his work on behalf of persons with intellectual disabilities in China.

== Personal life ==
Professor Alford is married to Dr. Yuanyuan Shen, a lawyer, and an Associate in Research at the Fairbank Center for the East Asian Research of Harvard University since 1991. She is a graduate of People's University of China (now Renmin University of China) in Beijing (LLB, 1983; LLM, 1986), Harvard Law School (LLM, 1988), and the University of Wisconsin (SJD, 1998). Her father was Shen Zulun, a governor of Zhejiang Province in China.

Alford and his wife Dr. Shen have two children, Daniel Alford, a lawyer, and Benjamin Alford, a teacher and educator.

Alford and his family reside in Belmont, Massachusetts.

== Selected publications ==
=== Books ===
- Alford, William P.,To Steal a Book Is an Elegant Offense: Intellectual Property Law in Chinese Civilization, Stanford, Calif. : Stanford University Press, 1995. ISBN 0-8047-2270-6
- Alford, William P., (editor), Raising the bar : the emerging legal profession in East Asia, Cambridge, Mass. : East Asian Legal Studies, Harvard Law School, 2006. ISBN 0-674-01452-9

=== Articles ===
- Alford, William P.; Liebman, Benjamin. "Clean Air, Clean Processes? The Struggle Over Air Pollution Law in the People's Republic of China," 52 Hastings Law Journal 703 (2001).
- Alford, William P., "Exporting the 'Pursuit of Happiness'," 113 Harvard Law Review 1677 (2000)
- Alford, William P., "Have You Eaten, Have You Divorced? Debating the Meaning of Freedom in Marriage in China" in Realms of Freedom in Modern China (William C. Kirby ed., Stanford University Press, 2004).
- Alford, William P., "Of Lawyers Lost and Found: Searching for Legal Professionalism in the People's Republic of China" in Raising the Bar: The Emerging Legal Profession in East Asia (East Asian Legal Studies, Harvard Law School, 2007).

== See also ==
- J. Mark Ramseyer: Professor of Japanese legal studies at HLS; member of East Asian Legal Studies advisory committee
- Jerome A. Cohen: New York University scholar (emeritus) of Chinese law
- Donald C. Clarke: George Washington University Law School expert on Chinese law
- Derk Bodde (1909–2003): U.S. sinologist and scholar of pre-modern Chinese law and society
