= La Mesa prison =

Prison in Baja California, Mexico

Coordinates: 32°30′23″N 116°58′10″W

La Mesa State Penitentiary is a prison in the La Mesa borough of Tijuana, Baja California, Mexico. It is considered "one of the most notorious prisons in Latin America". The prison was built for 2,000 inmates and had 2,500 inmates in the 1990s, but the number increased to over 7,000 by the 2010s. Prisoners have committed offenses ranging from theft to murder.

Some prison guards were reported to have taken bribes in exchange for releasing prisoners or offering better conditions.

Sister Antonia Brenner, a Catholic nun, voluntarily lived with the inmates of La Mesa Prison for over thirty years, and was called "La mama" or the "Prison Angel". She lived in a 10-by-10 cell.

In 2002, police demolished a luxury condominium for bribe-paying inmates inside the prison. At that time, the most dangerous inmates were transferred to a new facility near Tecate.

== Incidents ==
In April 1990, a drug raid by Federal Judicial Police officers resulted in the death of one man.

In September 2008, there were two riots. The September 13 riot, in which 3 inmates were killed, was caused by the inmates being upset over the death of an inmate caused by a prison search for drugs and weapons. The September 18 riot, which killed 19 and injured 12, was caused by frustration of the inmates over not being given any water since the first riot.

== Notable inmates ==
- Chalino Sánchez was incarcerated at the prison in 1984 on a variety of petty crimes. While in prison, he composed songs telling the stories of fellow inmates.
- Andrew Tahmooressi was incarcerated at the prison in 2014 after illegally bringing guns from the U.S. to Mexico.
