= Juan Sebastian Gonzalez =

Colombian-American politician

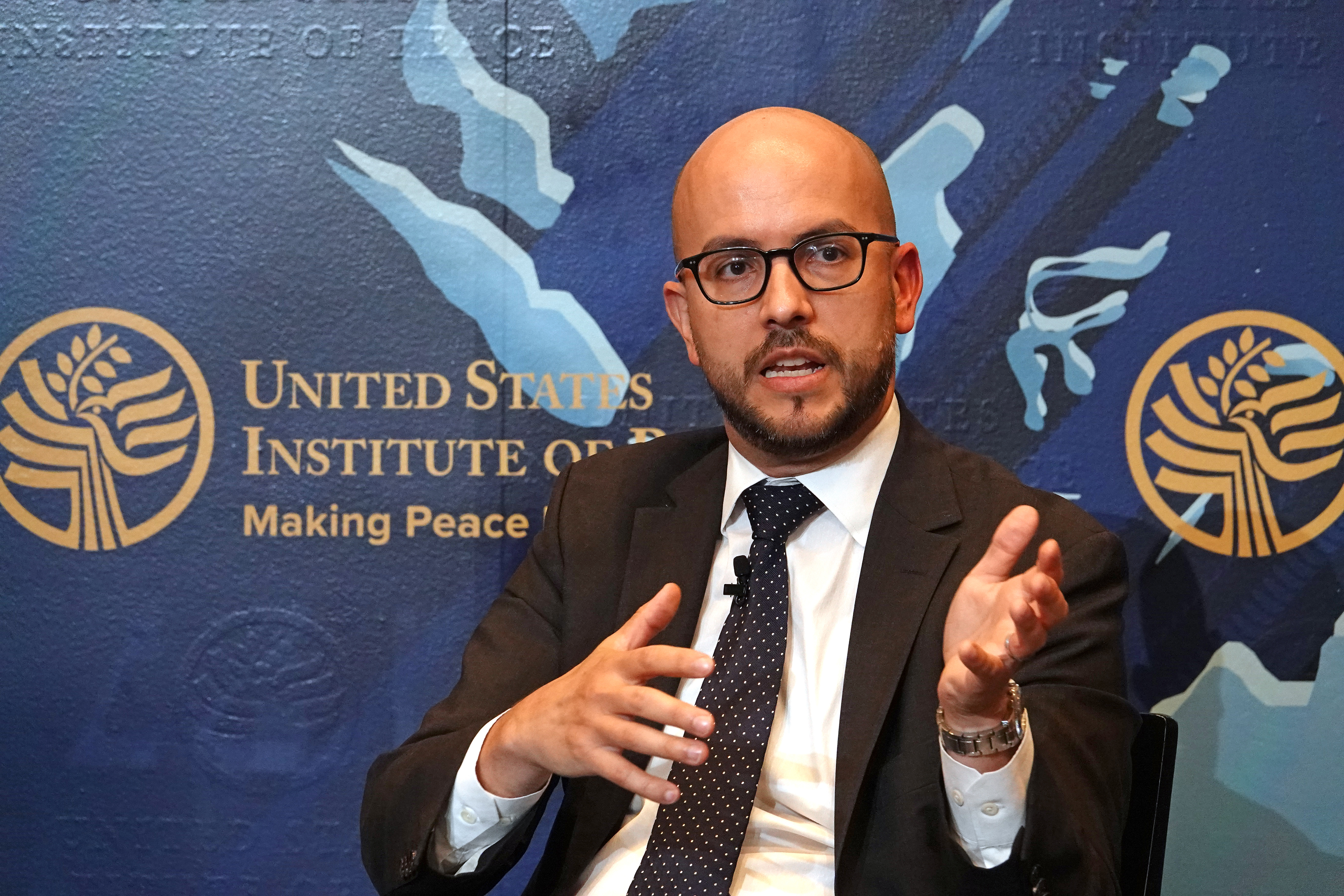

Senior Director of the National Security Council for the Western Hemisphere of the United States
- In office January 2021 – March 2024
- President: Joe Biden
- Leader: Jake Sullivan, head of the National Security Council

Deputy Assistant Secretary of State for Western Hemisphere Affairs
- President: Barack Obama
- In office March 2016 – January 2017

Personal details
- Born: Cartagena, Colombia
- Party: Democratic
- Spouse: Sarah Platts
- Education: University of Buffalo (BS); Georgetown University (MA)

Juan Sebastián González is a Colombian-American politician who worked in U.S. foreign policy, particularly concerning Latin America.

== Early life and education ==
At the age of seven, González immigrated to the United States with his parents from Cartagena, Colombia, settling in New York. He pursued higher education at the University of Buffalo, earning a degree in sciences, and later obtained a master's degree in Latin American studies from Georgetown University's Walsh School of Foreign Service.

== Career ==
González served as a Peace Corps volunteer in Guatemala from 2001 to 2003. From 2011 to 2013, he was the U.S. National Security Council Director for Western Hemisphere Affairs, focusing on policy development in the Andean region. In 2013, González became Special Advisor to Vice President Joe Biden, advising on Western Hemisphere affairs. He later served as Deputy Assistant Secretary of State for Western Hemisphere Affairs, overseeing diplomatic engagement in Central America and the Caribbean.

During the Trump administration, he was a Senior Fellow at the Penn Biden Center for Diplomacy and Global Engagement and led the Latin America practice at The Cohen Group.

=== Biden Administration ===
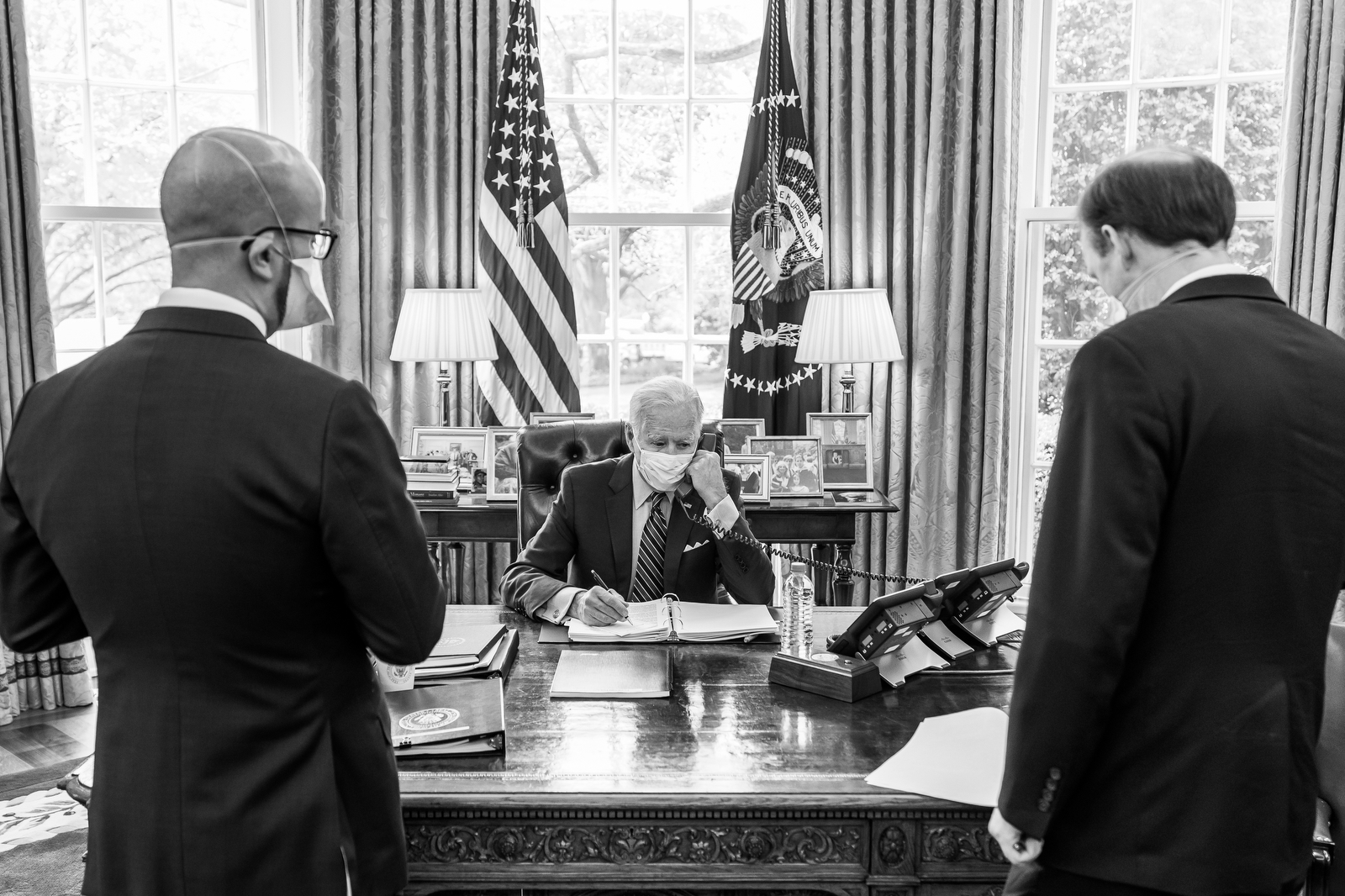
González pictured in the Oval Office with Jake Sullivan and U.S. President Joe Biden

González was Special Assistant to the President and Senior Director for the Western Hemisphere at the National Security Council in the Biden administration, helping shape U.S. policy toward Latin America. He worked on migration policy, challenges of corruption, and drug trafficking.

Gonález met with Argentina's president Javier Milei at the White House. He attended the inauguration of Ecuador's president Guillermo Lasso. He travelled to Guyana with Jon Finer to discuss issues of oil and security. He travelled to Venezuela in 2022.

He worked on U.S.-Venezuela policy, and some criticized his policy choices. He negotiated U.S. sanctions during the Venezuelan crisis for the Maduro government; after the disputed 2024 Venezuelan presidential election, some sanctions were reimposed on the Maduro government. He negotiated with Venezuelan politician Jorge Rodríguez for the release of Americans that were determined to be wrongfully imprisoned.

Gonzalez is featured in a documentary film Take No Prisoners (film) that centers on the detention of Eyvin Hernandez.

== Georgetown University ==
In February 2024, González announced his departure from his government position, citing personal reason, and took a position as a fellow at Georgetown's Americas Institute.

== Personal life ==
González is married to Sarah Platts, and they have two children.
