= Antonia Brenner =

American nun (1926–2013)

Mother Antonia Brenner ESEH
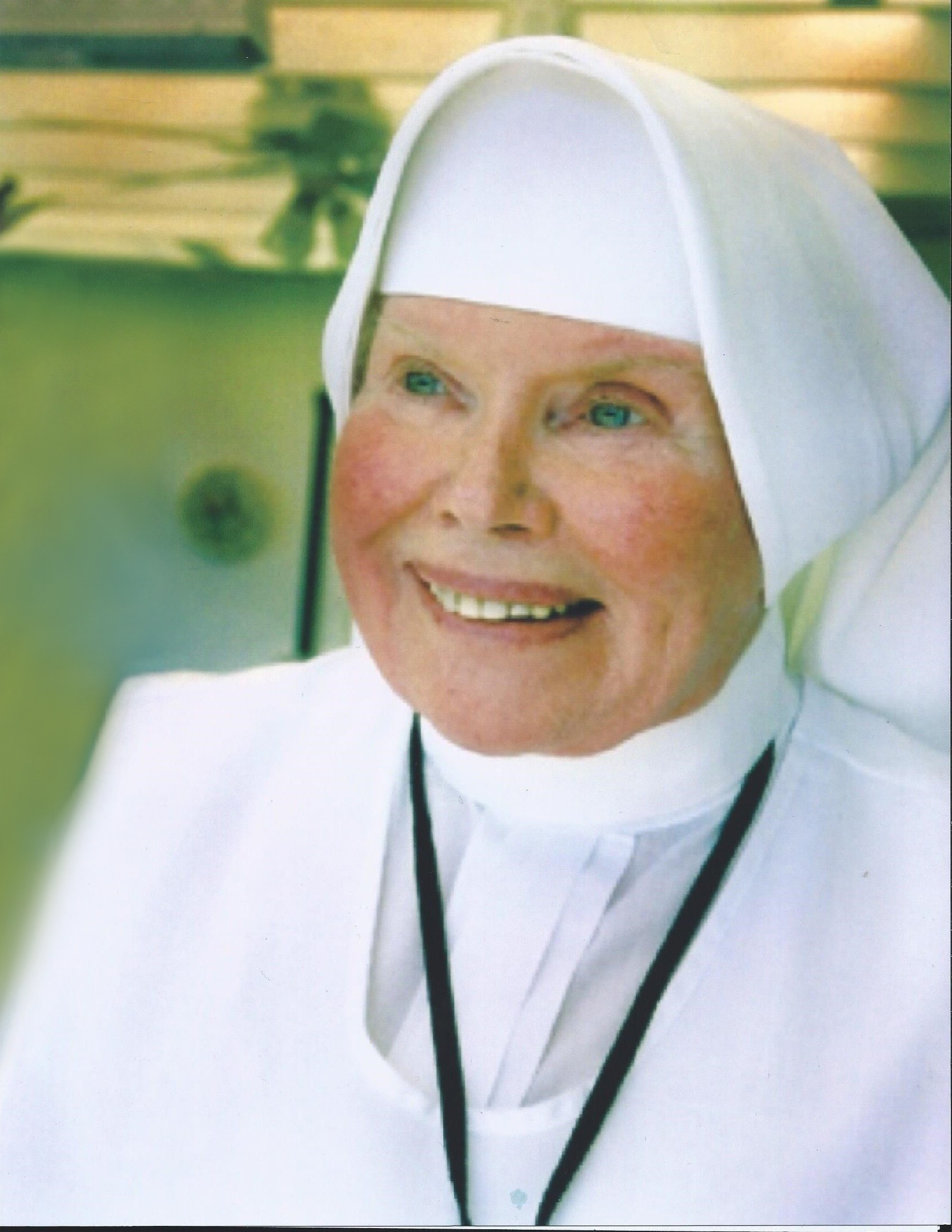
- Mother Brenner photo

Personal life
- Born: Mary Clarke; December 1, 1926 Los Angeles, California, United States
- Died: October 17, 2013 (aged 86) Tijuana, Mexico
- Website: http://eudistservants.org//

Religious life
- Religion: Catholic

Senior posting
- Post: La Mesa Prison, Tijuana, Mexico

Mother Antonia Brenner, better known as Mother Antonia (Spanish: Madre Antonia; December 1, 1926 – October 17, 2013) was an American religious sister and activist who chose to reside at the notorious maximum-security La Mesa Prison in Tijuana, Mexico and to care for the prison's inmates.. As a result of her work, she founded a new community called the Eudist Servants of the 11th Hour.

== Biography ==
Brenner was born Mary Clarke on December 1, 1926, to Joseph Clarke and Kathleen Mary Clarke. She was married and divorced twice, and had seven children, living in Beverly Hills, California. She has said that in 1969 she had a dream that she was a prisoner at Calvary and about to be executed, when Jesus Christ appeared to her and offered to take her place. She refused his offer, touched him on the cheek, and told him she would never leave him, no matter what happens to her. At some point in the 1970s, she chose to devote her life to the Church, in part because of this dream.

As an older, divorced woman, Clarke wasn't accepted as a candidate by a religious order or congregation, so she founded an institute for those in her situation: the Eudist Servants of the Eleventh Hour.

In 1983, Brenner received the Golden Plate Award of the American Academy of Achievement. In 2003 her religious community was formally approved by Rafael Romo Munoz, Bishop of the Diocese of Tijuana. On September 25, 2009, she received the Peace Abbey Courage of Conscience Award, presented at the Joan B. Kroc School of Peace Studies at the University of San Diego.

In addition to her work involving the detainees, she negotiated an end to a prison riot. She also persuaded the jail administrators to discontinue prisoner incarceration in substandard cells known as the tumbas ("tombs").

After a period of declining health, Brenner died on October 17, 2013, aged 86, at her Tijuana home.

== Legacy ==
The road outside the jail, known until recently as Los Pollos ("The Chickens"), was renamed in November 2007 to Madre Antonia in her honor.

Brenner is profiled in the book The Prison Angel, written by Pulitzer Prize-winning journalists Mary Jordan and Kevin Sullivan.

In 2010, Estudio Frontera released a DVD documentary on her life, La Mama: An American Nun's Life in a Mexican Prison. Produced and written by Jody Hammond, photographed and edited by Ronn Kilby, and narrated by Susan Sarandon, the film took five years to make.

In 2025, members of the Eudist Servants began a campaign for Mother Brenner to be canonized as a saint.
