= Bring Our Families Home =

Campaign for American hostages

- Formation: 2022
- Key people: Neda Sharghi, sister of Emad Shargi; Harrison Li, son of Kai Li; Amber Bobin, family of Paul Rusesabagina; Drew Havens, advocate for Eyvin Hernandez

Bring Our Families Home (BOFH) is a campaign by family members of American hostages and detainees advocating for their immediate release. The James Foley Legacy Foundation claims that there are approximately sixty Americans who are being held hostage or wrongfully detained abroad. The Foley Foundation provides support to BOFH.

The successful advocacy campaign of Trevor Reed's family, which pressured the U.S. government to secure his release from Russia, was a transformative moment for the families who founded BOFH. The detention of Brittney Griner in Russia, who is a member of BOFH, has elevated the profile of wrongful detentions and American hostages.

== Advocacy campaign ==
=== Purpose ===
The campaign launched in May 2022 to urge United States president Joe Biden to use "any and all means available," including prisoner exchanges, in order to secure the release of their family members. BOFH has asked for meetings with President Joe Biden by families of those who are detained in the same country.

In May 2022, BOFH gathered near the White House to request a meeting with President Joe Biden and to raise awareness about wrongful detentions. In June, the campaign wrote a letter to the President urging him to meet with families. Shortly after the letter was sent, families met virtually with Secretary of State Antony Blinken. Many families were left frustrated following the meeting.

=== Washington D.C. mural ===
In July 2022, the campaign unveiled a 15-foot tall mural that featured eighteen Americans who are wrongfully detained abroad. The mural spans an alley in Georgetown (Washington, D.C.) on M Street near Levain Bakery.

The mural included the images of WNBA Basketball player Brittney Griner, who was detained in Russia, Emad Shargi (Iran), Luke Denman (Venezuela), Alirio J. Zambrano (Venezuela), Morad Tahbaz (Iran), Mark Swidan (China), Jose Angel Pereira (Venezuela), Siamak Namazi (Iran), Baquer Namazi (Iran), Jorge Toledo (Venezuela), Matthew John Heath (Venezuela), Majd Kamalmaz (Syria), Airan Berry (Venezuela), Paul Whelan (Russia), Shahab Dalili (Iran) Kai Li (businessman) (China), and Paul Rusesabagina (Rwanda). The image of Eyvin Hernandez was added to the mural in October.

Isaac Campbell, an artist from Iowa, spent months creating the mural using paper, water, flour and sugar. Campbell spoke to symbolism of the mural: "It is going to be subjected to the elements, both natural and human. It is going to rip. It is going to tear. It is going fade. All those things are going to happen. That is a really important metaphor for the time that these families have been experiencing in a way that we can begin to think about the pressure that they are under and how time is an important factor in their lives.”

Members of the Women's National Basketball Association's New York Liberty attended an event unveiling the mural, including Coach Sandy Brondello, Stefanie Dolson, Rebecca Allen (basketball), Sami Whitcomb, Jocelyn Willoughby, and Marine Johannès. Washington Mystics players Natasha Cloud and Elizabeth Williams were also present. Special Envoy for Hostage Affairs Roger D. Carstens attended the ceremony. United States Department of State spokesperson Ned Price called the mural: "a powerful symbol of those who have been deprived and taken from their loved ones."

=== Image projections ===
In September 2022, the campaign projected images of their family members who are detained abroad on New York City buildings. The images included a call to action for President Joe Biden. The Campaign displayed the projections during the 77th meeting of the United Nations General Assembly, which President Biden attended.

== Response ==
=== Releases ===
In October 2022, BOFH held a welcome home event to celebrate the release of seven members of the campaign: Mark Frerichs, Baquer Namazi, Matthew John Heath, Jorge Toledo, Alirio Zambrano, Jose Luis Zambrano, and Jose Pereira. Jonathan Franks, a spokesperson for the campaign, said of exchange that freed seven Americans in Venezuela: "We applaud President Biden for having the courage to make this deal and encourage him and the administration to continue building upon the momentum."

=== Executive order ===
In July 2022, President Biden signed an executive order intended to increase the flow of information to Americans detained abroad and sanction those responsible for wrongfully detaining Americans abroad.
