= Robert C. O'Brien =

American lawyer (born 1966)

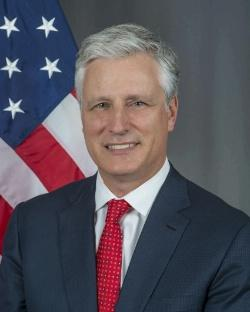
- Official portrait, 2018

27th United States National Security Advisor
- In office September 18, 2019 – January 20, 2021
- President: Donald Trump
- Deputy: Charles Kupperman; Matthew Pottinger
- Preceded by: John Bolton
- Succeeded by: Jake Sullivan

2nd Special Envoy for Hostage Affairs
- In office May 25, 2018 – October 3, 2019
- President: Donald Trump
- Preceded by: James C. O'Brien
- Succeeded by: Roger D. Carstens

Personal details
- Born: Robert Charles O'Brien Jr. June 18, 1966 (age 60) Los Angeles, California, U.S.
- Party: Republican
- Spouse: Lo-Mari O'Brien
- Children: 3
- Education: University of California, Los Angeles (BA); University of California, Berkeley (JD)

Military service
- Allegiance: United States
- Branch/service: United States Army; Army Reserve
- Rank: Major
- Unit: Judge Advocate General's Corps

Robert Charles O'Brien Jr. (born June 18, 1966) is an American attorney who was the twenty-seventh United States national security advisor from 2019 to 2021. He was the fourth and final person to hold the position during the first presidency of Donald Trump. He is currently the chairman of the American Global Strategies consulting firm.

== Early life and education ==
O'Brien was born in Los Angeles and raised in Santa Rosa, California, where he attended Cardinal Newman High School. He won a Rotary scholarship to study at the University of the Free State in South Africa in 1987. He received a Bachelor of Arts in political science from the University of California, Los Angeles in 1989, and a Juris Doctor from the UC Berkeley School of Law in 1992.

== Early career ==
From 1996 to 1998, O'Brien was a legal officer with the United Nations Compensation Commission in Geneva, Switzerland. O'Brien was a major in the Judge Advocate General's Corps of the United States Army Reserve.

=== Private practice ===
O'Brien was the California managing partner of the law firm Arent Fox LLP for seven years.

O'Brien was a founding partner, along with former federal judge Stephen Larson, of the Los Angeles boutique law firm Larson O'Brien LLP, which they established in January 2016. O'Brien retired from the firm when he was appointed national security advisor.

=== George W. Bush and Obama administrations ===
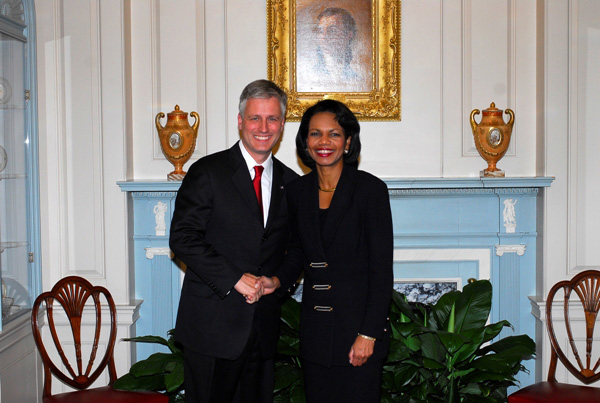
O'Brien with Condoleezza Rice in 2007

O'Brien was nominated by President George W. Bush as the U.S. alternate representative to the 60th session of the United Nations General Assembly during 2005–06.

O'Brien was co-chairman of the U.S. Department of State's Public-Private Partnership for Justice Reform in Afghanistan, launched in December 2007, which "promoted the rule of law" in Afghanistan by training judges, prosecutors, and defense attorneys. He continued this role during the first term of the Obama administration.

On July 31, 2008, President Bush announced his intention to appoint O'Brien to serve in his administration as a member of the Cultural Property Advisory Committee, an advisory committee on issues involving antiquities and cultural matters, for the remainder of a three-year term which expired on April 25, 2011.

=== Mitt Romney 2012 campaign ===
In October 2011, O'Brien was named to Mitt Romney's advisory team as co-chair of the International Organizations Work Group.

=== 2016 presidential election ===
Later, in May 2015, he became an adviser on foreign policy and national security affairs for Wisconsin Governor Scott Walker's presidential campaign. After Walker left the race, O'Brien advised Ted Cruz's campaign. During the time he advised Cruz's presidential campaign, he said: "It's clear that Vladimir Putin just doesn't like [Hillary Clinton], and is going to do what he can to help Donald Trump."

=== First Trump administration (2017–2019) ===
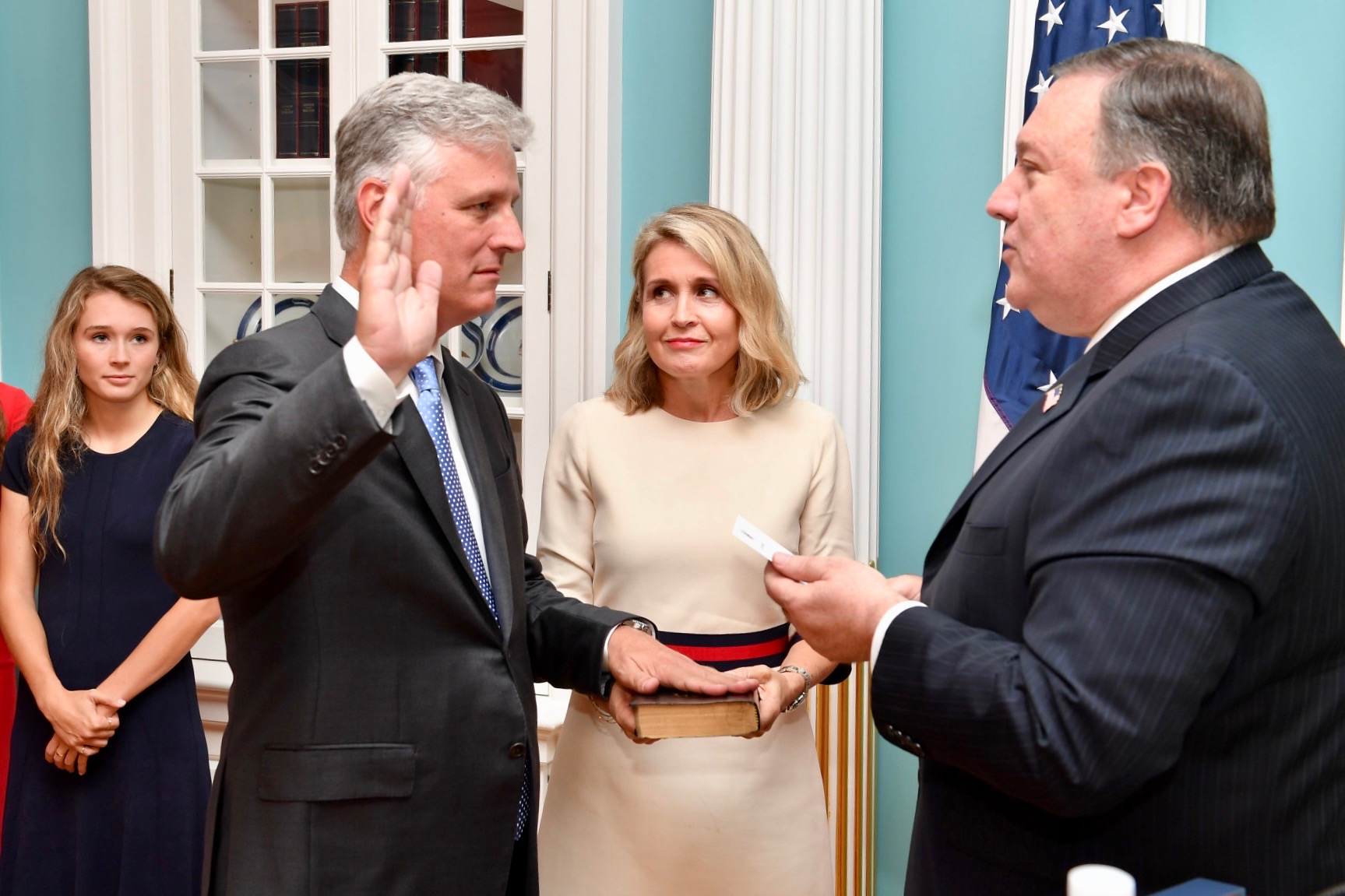
O'Brien sworn in as presidential envoy for hostage affairs in 2018.

In 2017, O'Brien was under consideration by the Donald Trump administration to serve as secretary of the navy. The Orange County Register editorial board endorsed O'Brien to serve in this position. Later in the administration, O'Brien advocated publicly for a larger Navy and visited several U.S. shipyards.

From May 25, 2018 to October 3, 2019, O'Brien served as the special presidential envoy for hostage affairs. He was given the rank of ambassador one year after his appointment. As envoy for hostage affairs, O'Brien attended the trial of the American rapper ASAP Rocky, on assault charges, in Stockholm, Sweden, telling reporters, "The president sent me here, so it's totally appropriate. I also help free people that are held by governments, so unjustly detained Americans." O'Brien had written the Swedish government warning of "negative consequences" if the case was not resolved. The Swedish government and court rejected political pressure in the case, citing rule-of-law principles; the rapper was ultimately convicted of assault, and sentenced to time served.

In 2018, as envoy for hostage affairs, O'Brien helped obtain the release of American pastor Andrew Brunson, who had been held prisoner for two years in Turkey, raising U.S.-Turkish tensions. O'Brien was also involved in obtaining the release of Danny Burch, an American oil worker held in Yemen for a year, and who ultimately received an Oval Office meeting with President Trump. In June 2022, French President Emmanuel Macron awarded O'Brien the rank of chevalier in the Legion d'honneur, in part for his assistance in helping to rescue two French hostages kidnapped abroad.

== National security advisor ==
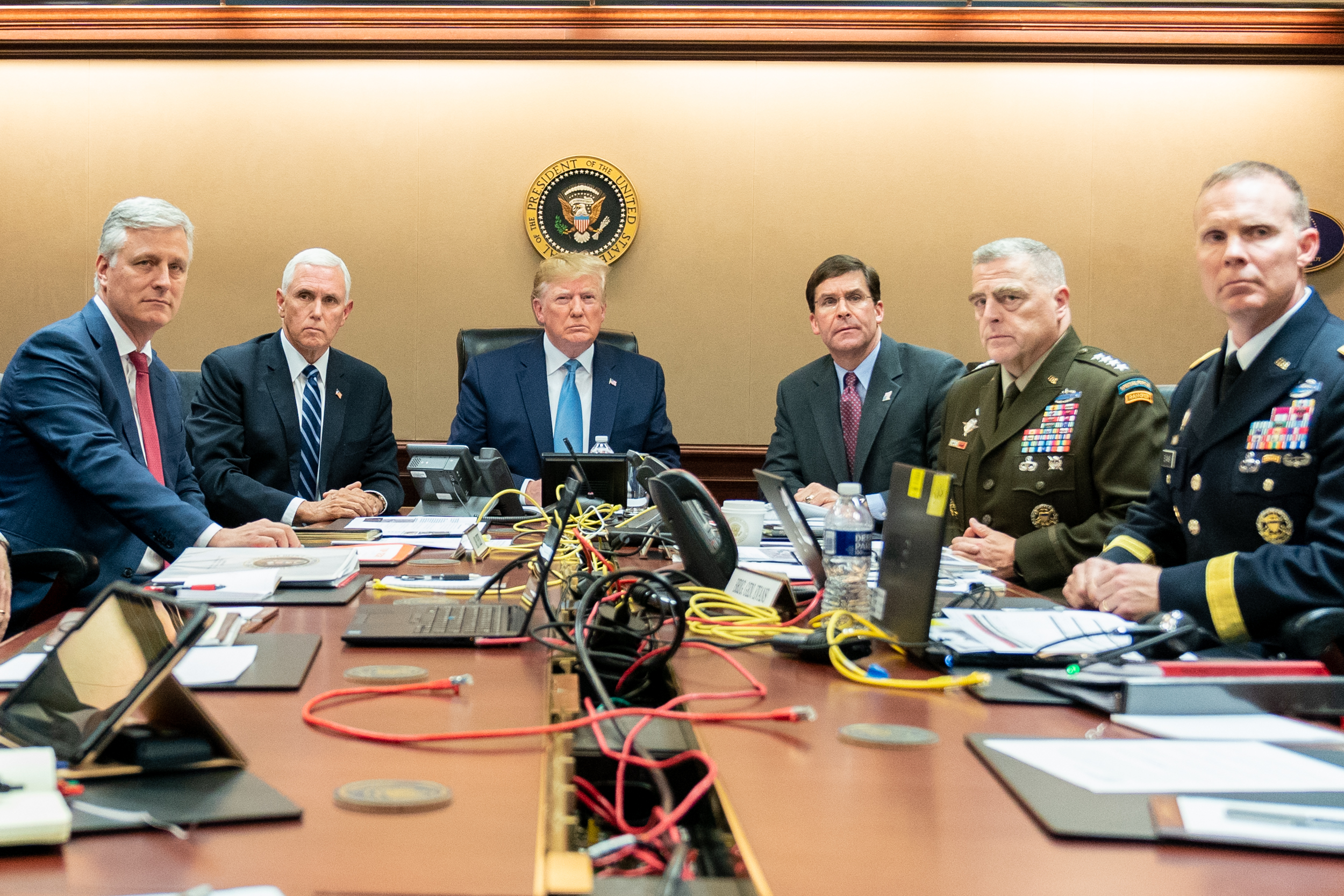
National Security Advisor Robert O'Brien (left) in the White House Situation Room during the U.S. military raid on Abu Bakr al-Baghdadi in 2019.

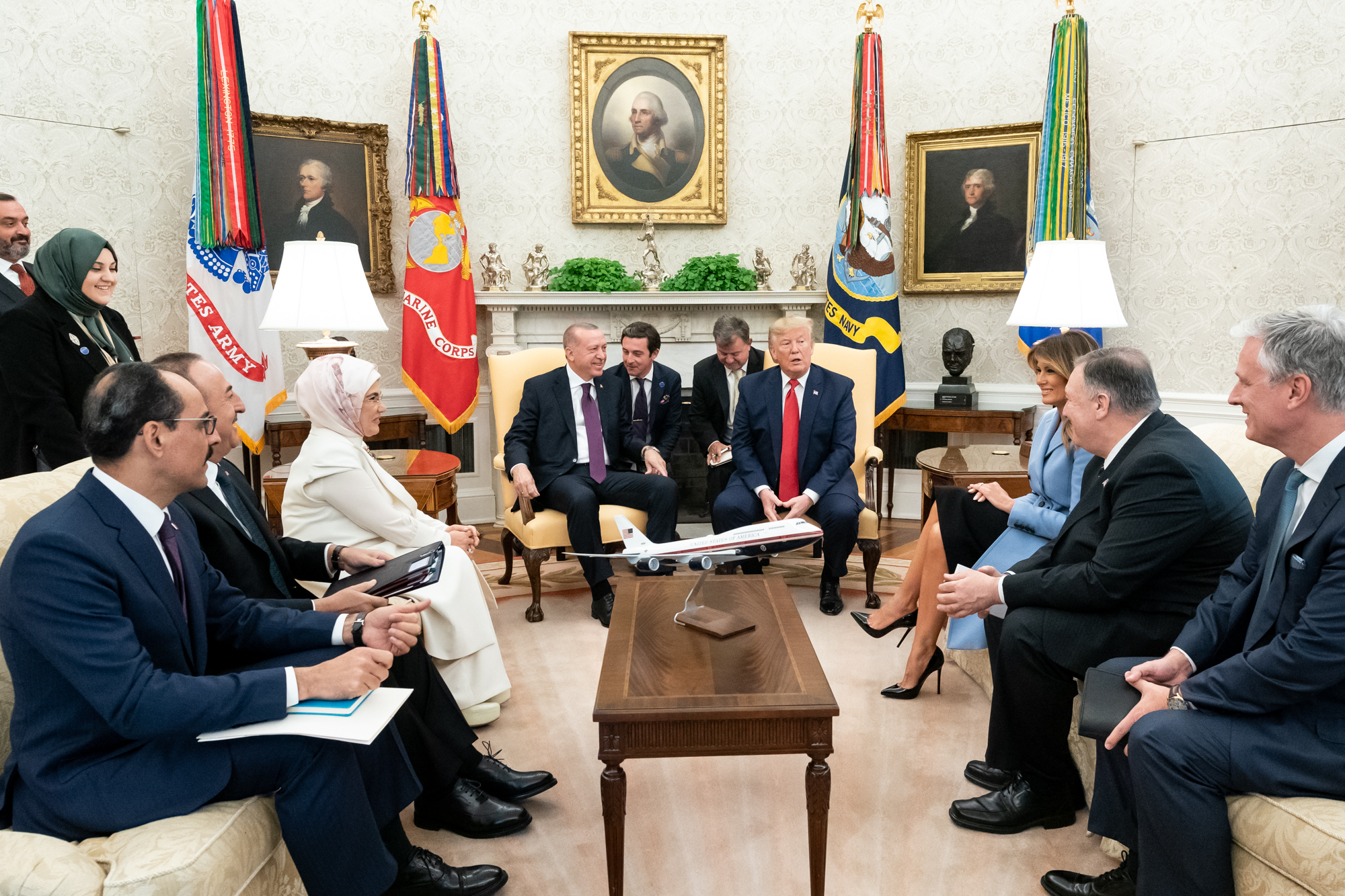
O'Brien, Trump and Mike Pompeo with Turkey's President Recep Tayyip Erdoğan in November 2019.

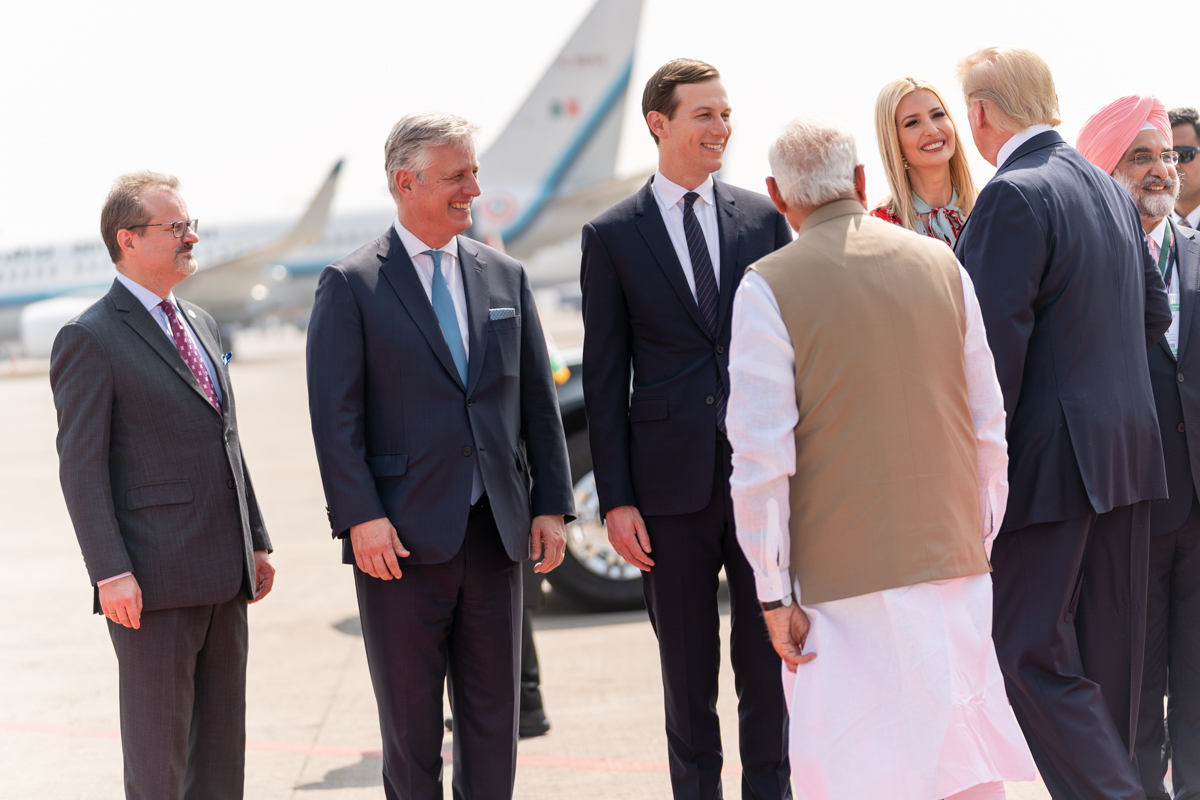
Trump, O'Brien and Jared Kushner with Indian Prime Minister Narendra Modi in Ahmedabad, India, February 2020

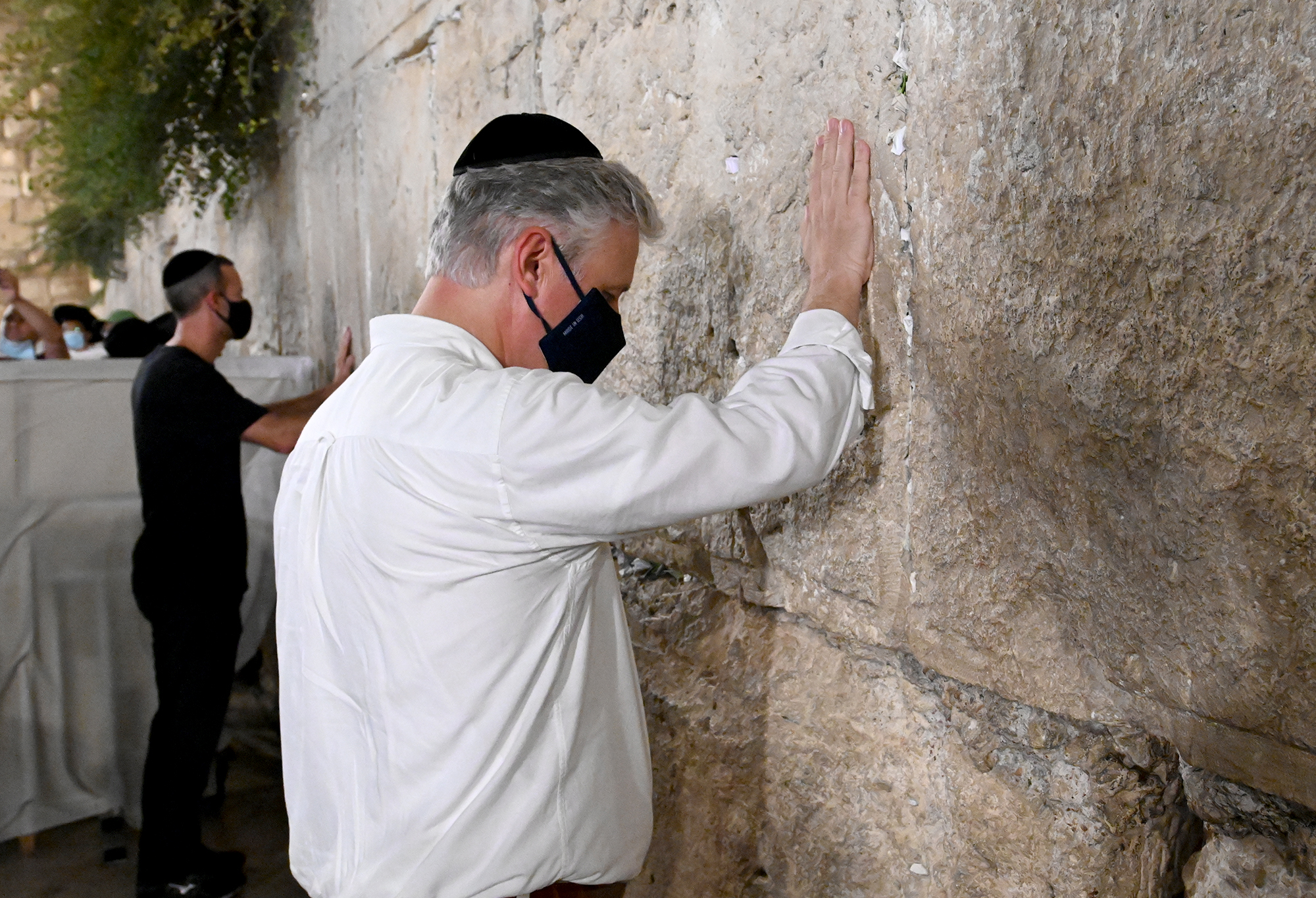
O'Brien prays at the Western Wall in Jerusalem's Old City in 2020.

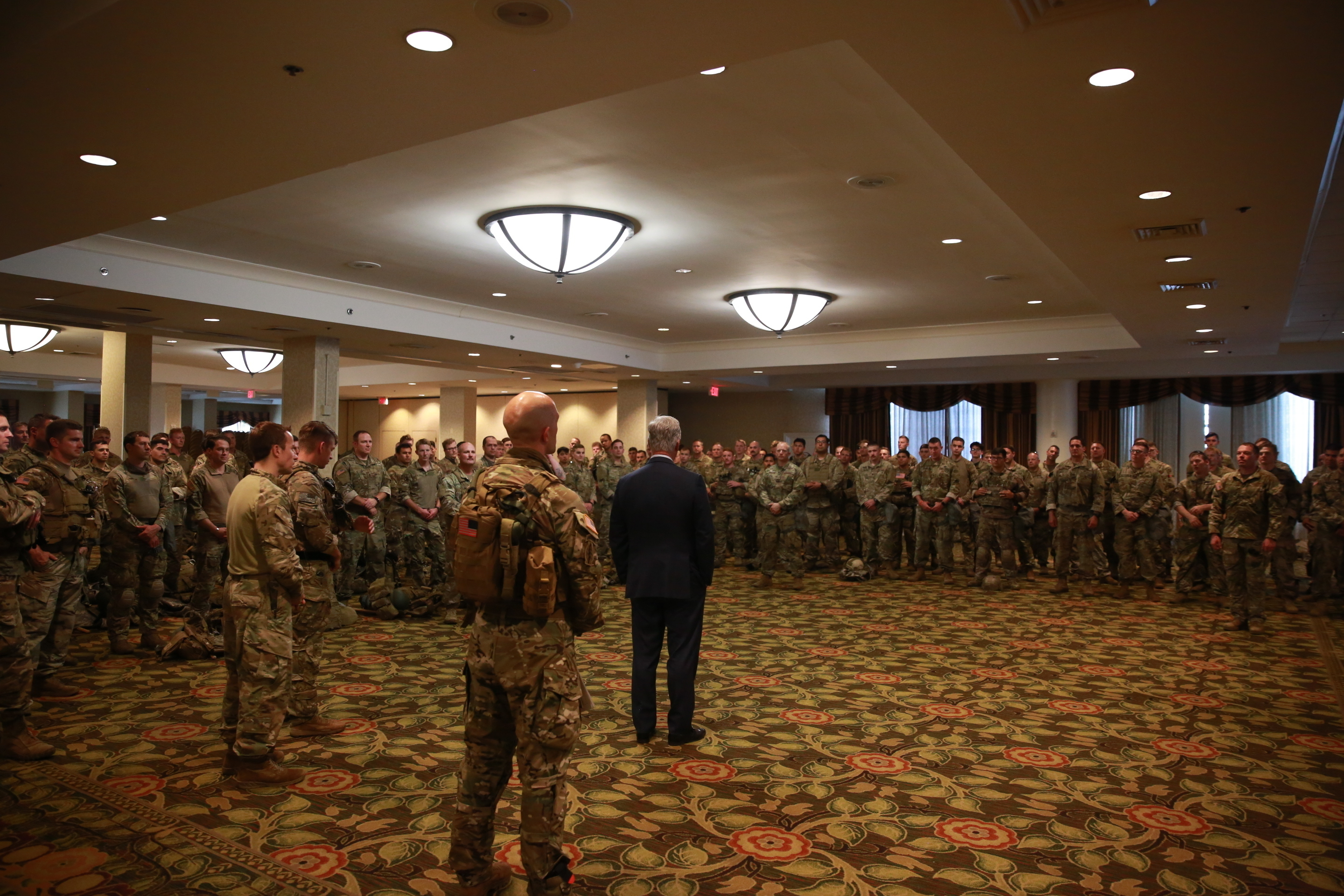
O'Brien (center) speaks to soldiers of the 19th Special Forces Group during the George Floyd protests in Washington, D.C., June 5, 2020

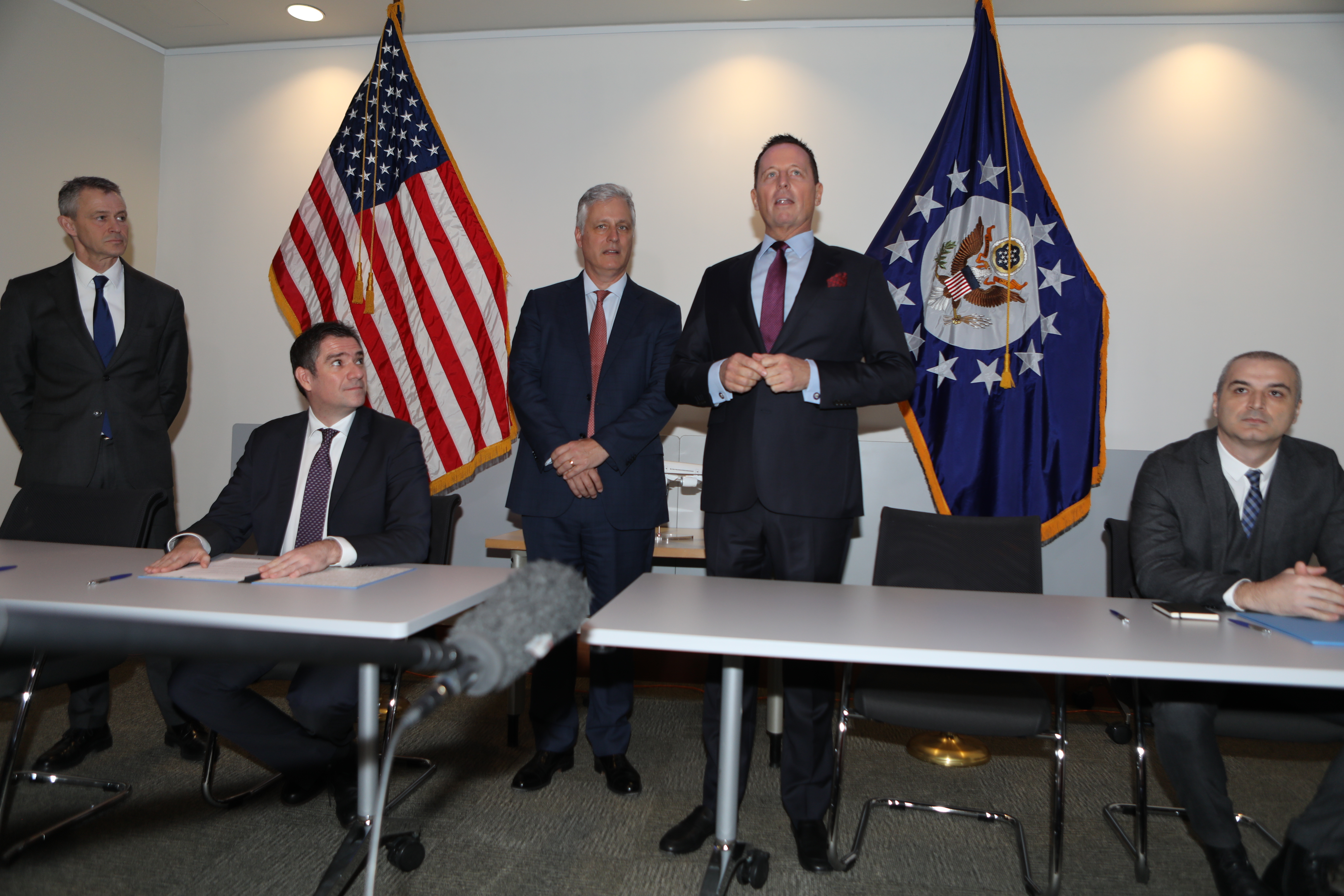
Milun Trivunac, State Secretary of the Ministry of Economy of Serbia (sitting left), Richard Grenell, Special US Presidential Envoy for Serbia and Kosovo Peace Negotiations (standing right), Eset Berisha, Director of the Civil Aviation Authority of Kosovo (sitting right)

=== Appointment ===
O'Brien took office as the twenty-seventh United States national security advisor on September 18, 2019. President Trump appointed O'Brien to succeed John Bolton, who resigned earlier that month. A few days later, O'Brien announced that Matthew Pottinger would become the deputy national security advisor, replacing Charles Kupperman in that role. O'Brien was seen as a traditional foreign policy conservative rather than a firebrand.

Early in his tenure, O'Brien accompanied Vice President Mike Pence to meet Turkish President Recep Erdogan in efforts to achieve a ceasefire between Turkey and Kurdish forces in Syria after the U.S. abruptly withdrew military forces that stood between Turkish and Kurdish forces.

In December 2019, O'Brien defended Trump's decision to pardon Navy SEAL Eddie Gallagher, who was accused by several fellow Navy SEAL members of his platoon of shooting unarmed civilians who posed no threat and of murdering an injured 17-year-old ISIS fighter, but who was convicted of only "wrongfully posing for an unofficial picture with a human casualty".

After the Trump administration's January 2020 drone strike against Qasem Soleimani, the head of the Iranian Islamic Revolutionary Guard Corps and commander of its Quds Force, O'Brien defended the intelligence the administration used to justify the killing, arguing that Soleimani had been planning attacks on U.S. military and diplomatic installations in Iraq and elsewhere in the Middle East.

The National Security Council under O'Brien focused on China; he aligned himself with Peter Navarro, a fellow hardliner on China. He threatened sanctions against China if it moved to pass a national security law that pro-democracy activists believed would undermine freedom in Hong Kong. O'Brien also criticized China for its actions amid territorial disputes in the South China Sea, and oversaw an increase in U.S. and allied military activity intended to guarantee freedom of navigation. O'Brien criticized China's government, saying in a speech that "The Chinese Communist Party is Marxist-Leninist," and "The party General Secretary Xi Jinping sees himself as Josef Stalin’s successor." In the same speech, he asserted: "Together with our allies and partners, we will resist the Chinese Communist Party's efforts to manipulate our people and our governments, damage our economies, and undermine our sovereignty."

When many other intelligence officials who had been involved in briefing Trump on national security characterized Trump as inattentive, O'Brien disputed the characterization, saying Trump was "laser-focused on the issues at hand and asks probing questions throughout the briefings — it reminds me of appearing before a well-prepared appellate judge and defending the case."

In May 2020, after the murder of George Floyd by Minneapolis police, O'Brien rejected that there was systemic racism in U.S. police forces.

In an article published on July 12, 2020, three weeks after the release of his predecessor's book The Room Where It Happened, O'Brien defended Trump's record on China, stating that "the United States continues to stand against the Chinese Communist Party’s coercive population-control policies, especially as they are aimed at the Uighurs."

=== COVID-19 pandemic ===
O'Brien was involved in early deliberations about reacting to the COVID-19 pandemic. In early March 2020, O'Brien and Alex Azar advised Trump to halt travel from Europe, disagreeing with several other Trump advisors, including Steve Mnuchin and Larry Kudlow. According to Washington Post reporter Bob Woodward, O'Brien counseled Trump that, "This will be the biggest national security threat you face in your presidency...This is going to be the roughest thing you face."

In May 2020, O'Brien said of China's handling of the pandemic: "The cover-up that they did of the virus is going to go down in history along with Chernobyl." In December 2020, O'Brien explained in an interview that China "absolutely could have done more" when it came to COVID-19 and that "the Chinese loss of credibility will be very difficult for them to overcome".

=== Controversy over Russian disinformation efforts ===
Brian Murphy, who was acting chief of intelligence at the U.S. Department of Homeland Security from March 2018 until August 2020, alleged that he was instructed "to cease providing intelligence assessments on the threat of Russian interference in the United States, and instead start reporting on interference activities by China and Iran." John Cohen, who was under secretary of intelligence at the Department of Homeland Security during Barack Obama's presidency, stated "By blocking information from being released that describes threats facing the nation... undermines the ability of the public and state and local authorities to work with the federal government to counteract the threat."

=== Kosovo–Serbia talks ===
A summit at the White House between Kosovo and Serbia was organized by Richard Grenell and scheduled for September 3 and 4, 2020. Grenell, along with O'Brien, co-hosted the talks. On September 4, the agreements were signed by Serbian President Aleksandar Vučić and Kosovo Prime Minister Avdullah Hoti. The signing ceremony took place in the Oval Office at the White House in the presence of US President Donald Trump on September 4, 2020. Kosovo awarded O'Brien the Presidential Medal of Merit for his work on the effort.

=== Abraham Accords ===
O'Brien was in office when the United States brokered the Abraham Accords, under which United Arab Emirates (UAE), and later Bahrain, Morocco, Oman, and Sudan, normalized diplomatic relations with Israel. In August 2020, O'Brien said that Trump should be eligible for the Nobel Peace Prize after the initial Israel-UAE agreement. O'Brien served as part of a U.S.-Israeli delegation on the first commercial flight from Israel to the UAE on August 31, 2020. The UAE and Israel moved to establish full diplomatic ties after Israel agreed to suspend a plan to annex parts of the occupied West Bank. O'Brien had advocated for other Arab and Muslim countries to join the accords. Trump awarded O'Brien, along with six other top aides, the National Security Medal for his role in achieving the agreement.

=== End of first Trump administration ===
After losing the November 2020 election to Joe Biden, Trump attempted to subvert the election result and remain in power. O'Brien was among the small number of senior Trump administration officials to acknowledge Biden's victory, saying on November 16, 2020, that he would oversee a "very professional transition" by NSC to President-elect Biden's incoming administration. O'Brien remained National Security Advisor until Trump's term expired on January 20, 2021. In 2023, O'Brien reportedly was subpoenaed by Special Counsel Jack Smith as part of the special counsel investigation into Trump's handling of classified documents and efforts to overturn the 2020 election.

=== China and Taiwan ===
On January 20, 2021, the Chinese government imposed sanctions against O'Brien and 27 other Trump administration officials that "planned, promoted and executed a series of crazy moves, gravely interfered in China's internal affairs, undermined China's interests, offended the Chinese people, and seriously disrupted China-U.S. relations". The sanctions ban them from entering China, including Hong Kong and Macau, and restrict companies and institutions associated with them from doing business in China.

On March 21, 2023, Taiwanese President Tsai Ing-wen presented O'Brien with the Order of Brilliant Star with Special Grand Cordon, in recognition of his contributions to Taiwan-US relations. At the time, O'Brien was leading a task force from the Global Taiwan Institute.

== After the first Trump administration ==
O'Brien remained politically active after leaving the White House. He was an early supporter of JD Vance in his successful bid for a Senate seat in 2022.

=== 2024 presidential election ===
In late 2020 and 2021, O'Brien was seen as a possible "dark horse" contender for the 2024 Republican presidential nomination. In November 2020, O'Brien said he is "fully focused on my current job" but added: "I'm not going to make a Shermanesque statement about never running under any circumstances." That month, Politico reported that O'Brien had discussed the possibility of a presidential candidacy with friends and associates. O'Brien's visits to early states in the primary process, including New Hampshire and Iowa, fueled further speculation. Former Republican National Committee (RNC) chair Michael Steele questioned O'Brien's viability as a candidate given his lack of name recognition or distinct electoral niche.

An article published in The American Conservative suggested that O'Brien's reported presidential aspirations are a way to build his stature for a future appointment as Secretary of State or Secretary of Defense, adding: "O'Brien remains in Trump's good graces, as well as staying in good standing in Washington's foreign policy community."

However, throughout the lead-up to the election, O'Brien contended he would "never" run if Trump decided to run again, and that Trump would have his "100% support." He subsequently endorsed Trump on the first day of his campaign. He also organized a public letter of national security-related professionals who supported Trump's reelection.

=== Second Trump administration ===
On February 11, 2025, Trump appointed O'Brien to the President's Intelligence Advisory Board.

=== Private sector ===
In July 2022, O’Brien was elected chairman of the board of directors of the Richard Nixon Foundation, which operates the Richard Nixon Presidential Library and Museum.

In 2021, O'Brien established a consulting firm, American Global Strategies, advising companies on international and U.S. politics. The firm does not disclose its clientele, but said that it did not engage in lobbying and was not required to register under the Foreign Agents Registration Act (FARA). The firm announced a partnership with Skyline Capitol, headed by former Utah U.S. Representative Chris Stewart, in 2023.

Became a board member for National Endowment for Democracy in 2025

== Personal life ==
Raised a Catholic, O'Brien converted to the Church of Jesus Christ of Latter-day Saints in his twenties. His wife, Lo-Mari O'Brien, is of Afrikaner descent, and he is reportedly fluent in Afrikaans. The couple raised three children: Margaret, Robert and Lauren. His son Robert died in an accidental drowning in 2015.

== Books ==
O'Brien is the author of the 2016 book While America Slept: Restoring American Leadership to a World in Crisis. Writing in Foreign Policy, Daniel Runde said, "While America Slept is the 2016 equivalent of Richard Nixon's The Real War." A former colleague from the George W. Bush administration, Runde summarized O'Brien's views as follows:

Robert writes from a series of beliefs and assumptions that I also hold: a deep belief in American Exceptionalism, that peace comes through strength, that the United States is stronger when it partners with its allies and when America is a reliable friend to its allies, that the greatness of America comes from a people that respect tradition and the rule of law, and that (yes) we are the good guys and there are some bad guys out there.

In The Hill, Bart Marcois, a retired foreign service officer, wrote, "If you're wondering what trends and events will drive President-elect Donald Trump's foreign policy, you need to read While America Slept, by Robert O'Brien."

Other reviews were more critical. Alex Ward, the associate director in the Atlantic Council's Brent Scowcroft Center on International Security, noted that "O'Brien's book is frustrating because it starts with the assumption that all of Obama's foreign policy choices are bad and assumes the reader believes this as well...[H]is analysis, while passionately and decently argued, missed the bigger picture through the partisan fog." The book is broadly critical of the Obama administration's security and foreign policies.

While national security advisor, O'Brien edited the manuscript "Trump on China: Putting America First," which was a compilation of speeches about China by senior administration officials.

== See also ==
- ASAP Rocky § Assault in Sweden

Political offices
Preceded by John R. Bolton	United States National Security Advisor; 2019–2021	Succeeded by Jake Sullivan
