= Kai Li (businessman) =

American businessman

Kai Li is an American businessman who was detained in China in 2016. The United States government considered Li to be wrongfully detained under the Levinson Act as did the U.N. Working Group on Arbitrary Detention which declared Li's detention to be arbitrary. In November 2024, Li was released as part of a prisoner swap with China.

== Early life and career ==
Li was born in Shanghai, China, in 1962. He came to the United States to study at the age of twenty-seven and later naturalized as a United States citizen. Li owned an export business that bought and sold solar cells and related-technology to aerospace firms in the United States.

== Detention ==
In September 2016, Li travelled to Shanghai to mark the first anniversary of his mother's death. When he arrived at Pudong International Airport, Chinese authorities immediately seized him on state security charges. Li was held in secret detention for months without access to legal counsel under Residential Surveillance at a Designated Location (RSDL).

In July 2018, after months of detention, in a one-hour secret trial, Li was convicted of espionage. Li's lawyers contend that the state secrets that he is accused of stealing are freely available on the Chinese internet. Some have observed that China has aggressively targeted and arbitrarily detained foreign nationals and dual-nationals on charges of espionage or violation of state security laws, as in the detention of Michael Spavor and Michael Kovrig, Cheng Li, Nobu Iwatani, and Phan "Sandy" Phan-Gillis. Academics refer to this as hostage diplomacy.

Li was sentenced to ten years in prison and held at Qingpu Prison. Li's family reported to U.S. officials in 2022 that he was confined to a tiny cell with eleven other prisoners only allowed to leave for daily COVID-19 testing and less than one hour per week of exercise. Li's family has reported serious concerns for Li's health, indicating that Li has suffered a stroke, high blood pressure, chronic gastritis, and shingles while in prison. Li is allowed to speak to his family only once a month and only for minutes.

== Responses ==
=== Li family ===
In 2019, Li's family publicly pleaded for help securing his release. They asked President Donald Trump to plead for his release at the 2019 G20 Osaka summit. They also created a petition on Change.org calling for Li's release.

In 2020, Li's son, Harrison, said: “My father is yet another example of an American victim of Chinese diplomacy. He is currently the only US citizen being held in China on state security charges.” Harrison has urged U.S. government officials to be outspoken in calling for his father's release.

Li's family joined the Bring Our Families Home (BOFH) Campaign that calls on the United States Government to work for the release of Americans wrongfully detained around the world. Li was featured in a wheat paste mural in Washington, DC alongside other Americans detained abroad, including Brittney Griner.

=== United States Government ===
The United States governments considered Li to be wrongfully detained under the Levinson Act.

In 2019, Senator Charles Schumer said: "The Trump administration must use all tools available to prioritize bringing Mr. Li back home so he can be reunited with his family in New York.” Numerous lawmakers from New York wrote a letter to Trump urging him to act action on Li's case.

In 2020, a group of thirteen lawmakers in the United States sent a letter to President Donald Trump urging him to be "tenacious advocates" for those Americans wrongfully detained by the CCP. Senator Marco Rubio wrote that Li's detention highlights the risk to Americans if Chinese "security laws" expanded into Hong Kong.

In April 2022, the State Department adjusted its travel advisory to advise Americans to “reconsider travel” due to “arbitrary enforcement of local laws.” In July, Representative Thomas Suozzi sent a letter to President Joe Biden urging him the President to personally intervene in Li's case.

=== United Nations ===
In 2021, The U.N. Working Group on Arbitrary Detention declared Li's detention to be arbitrary. The report described his imprisonment as “political and not criminal."

== Release ==
Li was released on 27 November, 2024 as part of a prisoner swap with China.
