= Citgo Six =

Oil executives group detained in Venezuela

The Citgo Six is the name by which six senior executives of Citgo, formerly detained in Venezuela, are known. Citgo is a subsidiary of the state-owned oil company Petróleos de Venezuela (PDVSA).

== Overview ==
The executives were arrested on November 21, 2017, and accused of signing an agreement that was "unfavorable" for the Venezuelan subsidiary.

The executives denied the charges against them and stated that they were victims of a political move by the Venezuelan Maduro-led government to pressure the United States government. They were granted house arrest in December 2019, but were sent back to jail on the same day that President Donald Trump received Juan Guaidó (Maduro's opponent in the Venezuelan presidential crisis) at the White House. On November 26, 2020, the executives were sentenced on corruption-related charges.

On April 30, 2021, they were issued a measure of house arrest, but were transferred to El Helicoide after the extradition of Maduro-linked Colombian businessman Alex Saab in 2021, who was facing federal money laundering charges in the United States. The US government demanded the immediate release of the executives.

On March 9, 2022, one of the Citgo Six was released following a meeting between US officials, including US Ambassador to Venezuela James B. Story, and Venezuelan President Nicolás Maduro.

The families of the five remaining executives were a part of the Bring Our Families Home campaign which advocates for bringing home wrongful detainees and hostages. Their images are featured in a 15-foot mural in Georgetown (Washington, D.C.) along with those of other Americans wrongfully detained abroad.

On October 1, 2022, the remaining five members of the Citgo Six were released following a prisoner exchange.

On December 27, 2023, the Citgo Six were honored by Sylvester Turner for being exemplary members of the business community. Mayor Turner also proclaimed that December 19 in the city of Houston will be celebrated as “The Citgo Six Day.”

== See also ==
- Political prisoners in Venezuela
- Narcosobrinos affair
- Matthew John Heath
- United States–Venezuela relations
