= Andrew Tahmooressi =

US Marine veteran imprisoned in Mexico

- Military career
- Allegiance: United States of America
- Branch: United States Marine Corps
- Service years: 2008-2016
- Rank: Sergeant

Andrew Tahmooressi is a US Marine veteran who was imprisoned in Mexico after crossing the Mexican border with loaded guns.

== Early life ==
Tahmooressi grew up in Weston, Florida and graduated with honors from the Cypress Bay High school in 2007. He earned a pilot's license at the age of 17 and then moved to the Alaska's Kodiak Islands where he joined a commercial fishing crew. After his return to Florida he attended a local community college which he left to join the Marines.

== Career ==
In 2008, Tahmooressi joined the US Marines, he served two combat tours in Afghanistan. In 2012, Tahmooressi was honorably discharged but remained a reservist with commitment until 2016.

== Mexican border crossing ==
Around 10:30 p.m. on March 31, 2014, Tahmooressi crossed the Mexico–United States border in his Ford F-150 truck with three loaded guns. Tahmooressi claims he was driving out of a parking lot with the intention of heading north but instead took a wrong turn and drove into the El Chaparral Port of Entry where Mexican custom inspectors examined his pickup truck and found more than 400 rounds of ammunition and three loaded guns: a .45 caliber pistol, a 12-gauge shotgun and a 5.56mm AR-15 style rifle.

Tahmooressi was imprisoned in Tijuana's La Mesa Prison on illegal gun charges awaiting his trial. He was later moved to El Hongo Prison, Tecate after he attempted escape by climbing over a gate and heading up onto a roof, and then onto another one. He gave up when a guard opened fire, and an incident in which he slashed his neck with a broken light-bulb.

Tahmooressi first appeared in court May 28, 2014, but after Tahmooressi fired his first attorney the night before the hearing, which was postponed as a consequence. Tahmooressi was released from prison on Friday, October 31, 2014 after a judge in Tijuana ordered his immediate release, following pressure that U.S. politicians put on Mexico to release him. Eight months after he was jailed. Tahmooressi flew back the same day in a private jet.

Additionally at the time of crossing the Mexican border and during his imprisonment, Tahmooressi was suffering from post-traumatic stress disorder.

== Possession of drugs ==
Tahmooressi was then arrested in Dearborn County, Indiana in the early morning on April 7, 2016, and sentenced to a one-month jail sentence on one count of possession of marijuana under 30 grams.
