= Donald C. Clarke =

American academic

- Other name: 郭丹青
- Education: Princeton University (AB), University of London (MA) Harvard Law School (JD)
- Occupation: Scholar of Chinese law
- Employer: George Washington University

Donald C. Clarke is a law professor specializing in Chinese law at The George Washington University Law School. His interests range from Chinese criminal law and procedure to corporate governance. His Chinese name is Guo Danqing (郭丹青).

Clarke graduated with an A.B. from the Princeton School of Public and International Affairs (then the Woodrow Wilson School) at Princeton University in 1977 after completing a 139-page-long senior thesis titled "External Crisis and Internal Conflict in China." He then received a M.Sc. from University of London in 1983 and J.D. from Harvard Law School in 1987.

Before joining the faculty of George Washington University Law School, Clarke was a professor at the University of Washington School of Law.
