= Arrest of Trevor Reed =

2019 Russian arrest of an American

Trevor R. Reed (born 1991) is a United States Marine Corps veteran who was arrested in Russia in 2019, charged with ostensible violence against a Russian policeman. He was later sentenced to nine years in prison. His arrest has been criticized as motivated by political purposes. Following his arrest, his family engaged in a public advocacy campaign in order to secure his release.

In April 2022, Reed was released as a part of a 1-for-1 prisoner exchange, for Konstantin Yaroshenko, a Russian pilot convicted in the US for drug smuggling. The successful advocacy campaign of Reed's family, which pressured the U.S. government to secure his release from Russia, inspired the Bring Our Families Home Campaign.

== Incident and arrest ==
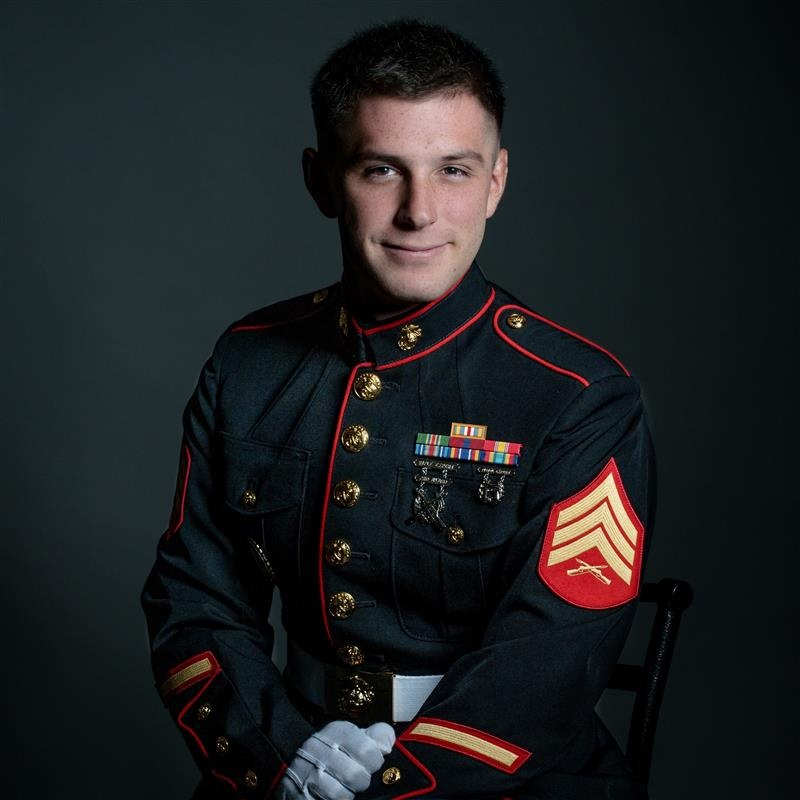
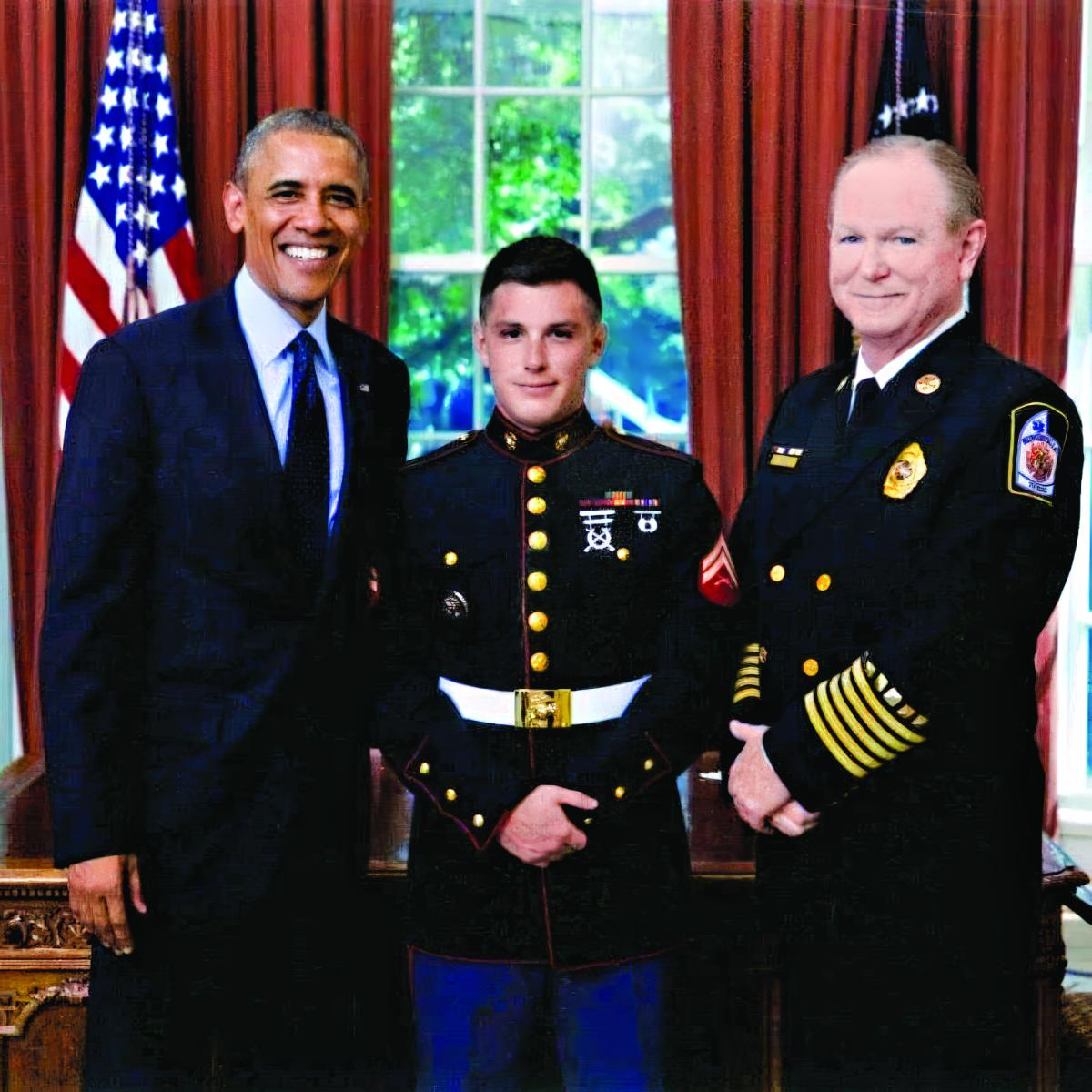
Reed in his USMC dress blue uniform.

Following a party in August 2019, Reed became extremely drunk to the point that some friends and his girlfriend, Alina Tsybulnik, decided to leave so Reed could recover. After calling the police because they assumed a drunk tank would be safe, two officers took Reed and told Tsybulnik he could be retrieved shortly. Upon her arrival, however, she found Reed's face to be bruised and FSB agents there to have interviewed him. Reed was charged under part 2 of article 318 of Russia's Criminal Code, which refers to violence committed against Russian officers. According to Russian authorities, while being driven to a police station, Reed grabbed the police officer driving, causing the car to swerve about uncontrollably.

== Sentencing ==
On July 30, 2020, Reed was sentenced to serve nine years in a Russian prison; this was in addition to time served since his arrest the previous year. Reactions to the news were quick and severe. Ambassador John J. Sullivan issued a statement on behalf of the US embassy, in which he said, "Today, U. S. citizen Trevor Reed was convicted in a Russian court following a trial in which the prosecution's case and the evidence presented against Mr. Reed were so preposterous that they provoked laughter in the courtroom. Even the judge laughed." He further stated, "we will not rest until Trevor is freed and returns home to the United States."

== Criticism of charges ==
Both Reed and his family have been intensely critical of the way in which the incident occurred and charges followed. Following his sentencing, Reed said, "I think anyone who has eyes and ears and who has been in this courtroom knows that I'm not guilty." Reed's father, Joey Reed, said, "I don't know at what level this was pushed. But somewhere someone in the government has pushed for Trevor to not leave Russia. It's obvious. There's no way that anyone, Russian or American, should ever have been convicted of this nothing."

According to testimony given by Tsybulnik, the officers' claim that the vehicle swerved as a result of Reed's assault was false, and she never saw the vehicle careen while following them to the police station. Additionally, despite there being security cameras in the police vehicle and police station, no footage of the alleged incident was made available to Reed's defense attorneys. Instead, Russian authorities claimed that the relevant footage had been erased.

== Release ==
On April 27, 2022, Reed was released back to the United States as part of a prisoner exchange for Konstantin Yaroshenko, a Russian pilot convicted of drug smuggling. Following his return, he and his family became advocates for helping to return Americans imprisoned overseas.

Reed has been supportive of Ukraine in the wake of the 2022 Russian invasion of Ukraine. He considers himself a member of NAFO, a pro-Ukrainian online movement to counter Russian disinformation. In November, he joined the Armed Forces of Ukraine. In July 2023, Reed was wounded by shrapnel from a land mine and was transported by a non-governmental organization to Landstuhl Regional Medical Center in Germany for treatment. His decision to volunteer in the war, followed by his subsequent injury, drew "exasperation" from the United States Department of State who discouraged Americans from traveling to or serving in Ukraine.

On October 9, 2024, the Investigative Committee of Russia designated Reed as a mercenary for serving in Ukraine and sentenced him in absentia to 14 1/2 years in prison. Reed mocked the ruling on social media, writing he had "serious doubts about the legitimacy of the trial I supposedly received".

== See also ==
- List of American people imprisoned in Russia
