= Majd Kamalmaz =

American psychotherapist and missing person

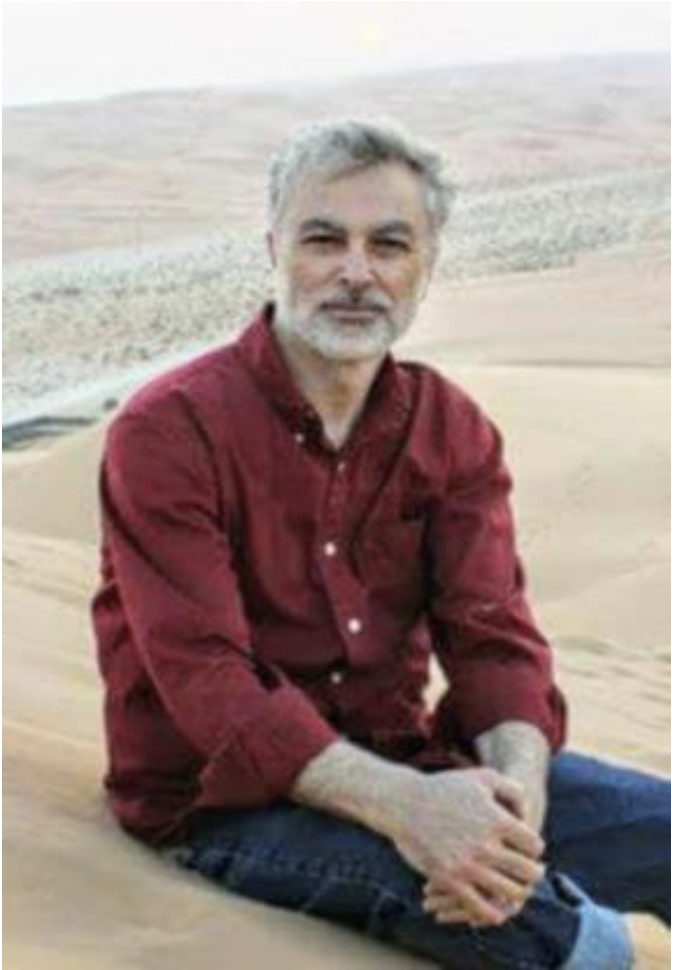
- Born: January 6, 1958; Syria
- Died: c. 2017; Syria
- Known for: Being detained in Syria
- Medical career
- Field: Psychotherapy

Majd Kamalmaz (January 6, 1958 – after February 2017) was a Syrian-American psychotherapist from Arlington, Virginia, who was detained in Syria in February 2017 and held until his death was announced on May 18, 2024.

Kamalmaz was running a nonprofit in Lebanon helping refugees deal with trauma when he drove to Syria in mid-February 2017 to visit a relative who had cancer. Once in Damascus, he called his wife to tell her that he had arrived safely. After that, the family never heard from him again.

His children appealed to Donald Trump for help. Kamalmaz was reported to be diabetic.

In early 2020, Kash Patel arrived in Damascus to negotiate the release of Kamalmaz and Austin Tice. The negotiations were unsuccessful.

Kamalmaz's family is a part of the Bring Our Families Home campaign, which advocates for bringing home wrongful detainees and hostages. Kamalmaz's image is featured in a 15-foot mural in Georgetown (Washington, D.C.) along with other Americans wrongfully detained abroad.

On May 18, 2024, The New York Times reported that national security officials told his family that highly credible, classified information indicated that he had died in captivity.

Miller & Chevalier and SETF (Syrian Emergency Task Force) Announced Civil Lawsuit Against Assad Regime seeking at least $70 million in punitive and compensatory damages for the unlawful detention, torture, and killing of Majd Kamalmaz.

External image
- https://www.fbi.gov/wanted/kidnap/majd-kamalmaz/@@download.pdf
