= Special Presidential Envoy for Hostage Affairs =

US Special office

United States Special Presidential Envoy for Hostage Affairs
- Seal of the United States Department of State
- Nominator: President of the United States
- Appointer: Secretary of State
- Formation: 2015
- Website: state.gov

The special presidential envoy for hostage affairs, or more formally the Office of the Special Presidential Envoy for Hostage Affairs, was established in 2015, by an executive order pertaining to the recovery of U.S. hostages held by non-state actors and of U.S. citizens wrongfully detained by foreign states. The Special Presidential Envoy leads and coordinates activities across the Executive Branch to bring home those Americans. The position was created in 2015 during the Obama administration.

In February 2020, President Trump announced his intention to appoint Roger D. Carstens as the next special presidential envoy.

In January 2021, incoming President Joseph R. Biden and incoming Secretary of State Antony Blinken requested that Roger Carstens stay on into the Biden administration.

During Trump's second presidential transition, he nominated Adam Boehler to that position, but he withdrew after it was leaked that he met Hamas representatives in Qatar.

== List of special presidential envoys ==
No.	Officeholder	Term start	Term end	Tenure length	President
1	Jim O'Brien	August 28, 2015	January 20, 2017	1 year and 146 days	Barack Obama
2	Robert C. O'Brien	May 25, 2018	October 3, 2019	1 year and 132 days	Donald Trump
acting	Hugh Dugan	October 4, 2019	March 1, 2020	150 days	Donald Trump
3	Roger D. Carstens	March 2, 2020	January 20, 2025	4 years and 325 days	Donald Trump
	Roger D. Carstens	March 2, 2020	January 20, 2025	4 years and 325 days	Joe Biden
acting	Dustin Stewart	January 21, 2025	Incumbent		Donald Trump
