= Joshua Geltzer =

American lawyer (born 1983)

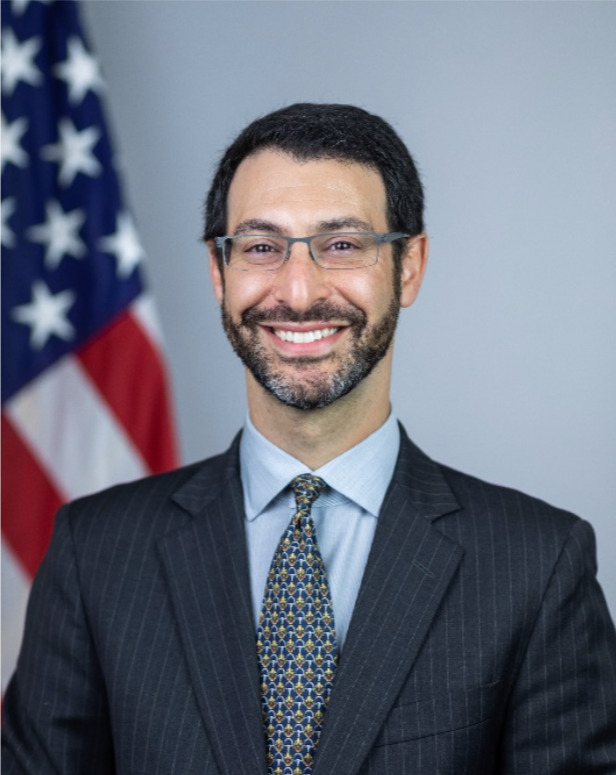

Deputy White House Counsel
- Incumbent
- Assumed office October 2023
- President: Joe Biden
- Leader: Jake Sullivan (Note: As the national security advisor head of the National Security Council); Ed Siskel (Note: As the White House counsel head of the Office of the White House Counsel)
- Preceded by: Jake Phillips

Deputy Homeland Security Advisor
- In office January 20, 2021 – October 2023
- President: Joe Biden
- Leader: Elizabeth Sherwood-Randall

Personal details
- Born: 1983 (age 42–43)
- Party: Democratic
- Spouse: Katherine Boone
- Education: Princeton University (BA); Yale University (JD); King's College London (PhD)

Joshua Geltzer (born 1983) is an American lawyer and national security expert. He served as deputy assistant to the president of the United States Joe Biden, deputy White House counsel, and legal adviser to the United States National Security Council.

== Early life and education ==
Geltzer is the son of Elise A. Geltzer and Robert L. Geltzer from New York. His mother has served as counsel to the New York State Continuing Legal Education Board, part of the New York State court system. His father has worked as a bankruptcy lawyer in private practice in New York and served on the American Bar Association’s board of governors from 1988 to 1991.

Geltzer attended Hunter College High School in New York City and then Princeton University. As a freshman at Princeton, he was influenced by the events of September 11, 2001. The tragedy pushed him towards public policy and Princeton's Woodrow Wilson School. He graduated summa cum laude and his senior thesis won the Myron Herrick Prize.

After Princeton, Geltzer pursued a Ph.D. in war studies at King's College London as a Marshall Scholar, where he wrote his dissertation on Al-Qaeda and U.S. counter-terrorism policy. Subsequently, Geltzer received his J.D. from Yale Law School, where he served as editor-in-chief of the Yale Law Journal.

After Yale Law School, Geltzer served first as a law clerk to Chief Judge Alex Kozinski of the Ninth Circuit Court of Appeals and then as a law clerk to Justice Stephen Breyer of the U.S. Supreme Court.

== Legal career ==
After his clerkships, he served as a senior advisor to the assistant attorney general for national security at the Department of Justice, advising on legal and policy issues related to national security. Geltzer then joined the Obama administration's United States National Security Council as deputy legal advisor to the NSC and then senior director for counterterrorism.

In 2017, he served as a professor of law and the executive director of the Institute for Constitutional Advocacy and Protection at Georgetown Law, where he focuses on defending constitutional rights and democratic governance. Geltzer is a member of the American Law Institute.

In 2021, Geltzer joined the Biden administration. He initially served as deputy homeland security adviser to President Biden.

In 2023, U.S. national security advisor Jake Sullivan assigned Geltzer, alongside top Mideast advisor Brett McGurk, to lead negotiations aimed at reaching a hostage deal between Israel and Hamas. The deal ultimately included a four-day cease-fire, Hamas releasing 50 women and children, and Israel releasing 150 Palestinian women and children. He has also worked on policy to counter violent domestic extremism in the United States.
