= Eyvin Hernandez =

Salvadoran American lawyer

Eyvin Hernandez is a Salvadoran American lawyer who works in the Los Angeles County Public Defender's Office in California. Hernandez was imprisoned in Venezuela after being arrested by Venezuelan military agents in March 2022. He was released on December 20, 2023.

== Early life and career ==
When Hernandez was a toddler, his parents fled the Salvadoran Civil War and immigrated to the Los Angeles area. He went on to graduate from the University of California, Los Angeles and UCLA School of Law.

After graduating from law school, Hernandez turned down lucrative jobs in the legal industry to work as a deputy public defender for the Los Angeles County Public Defender in Los Angeles County, California. In his role as a public defender, Hernandez represents indigent people and people who are experiencing homelessness in Los Angeles.

== Arrest and detention ==
In the weeks before his arrest, Hernandez had traveled to Colombia where he had been several times previously. Before he was due home from his trip, he accompanied a friend to the border of Norte de Santander Department (Colombia) and Táchira, Venezuela, a border area that is a dangerous region. Hernandez was arrested near this border by Venezuelan military agents on March 31 of 2022. Hernandez's family has maintained that he had no intention of entering Venezuela.

Hernandez was charged with illegally entering the country, criminal association and conspiracy. These charges are punishable by up to sixteen years in prison. He was imprisoned in a maximum security prison in Caracas, Venezuela.

== Responses to detention ==
Hernandez's brother Henry Martinez told the Associated Press: “My entire family deeply misses my brother. He has worked his entire career serving marginalized people and he is truly the best of us. We hope and pray that Eyvin can return home very soon from this mistaken arrest.” Martinez appeared on Univision News and called on members of the United States government to do more to secure the release of his brother. The family has asked for the U.S. Government to do more to bring Eyvin home. Hernandez's family is a part of the Bring Our Families Home campaign which advocates to bring home wrongful detainees and hostages. His image is featured in a 15-foot mural in Georgetown (Washington, D.C.) along with other Americans wrongfully detained abroad.

In April, the State Department issued a travel advisory about threats to Americans along the Venezuela-Colombia border. Later, the United States Department of State confirmed the arrest of U.S. Citizens in Venezuela and issued the following statement: "We take seriously our commitment to assist US citizens abroad. Due to privacy considerations, we have no further comment." A U.S. Official told EFE that they are following the situation closely and remain in communication with the family. Many in the U.S. government fear that Hernandez and other Americans are being used as political bargaining chips.

In July, U.S. President Joe Biden issued an executive order aiming to deter and punish those responsible for the wrongful detention of American citizens abroad. The State Department also issued an advisory that American citizens are at risk of wrongful detention in Venezuela.

On October 4, 2022, the Los Angeles Board of Supervisors unanimously approved a motion urging county congressional officials and the White House to secure Eyvin's release.

In October 2022, the State Department designated Eyvin as “wrongfully detained” and placed his case under the jurisdiction of the Special Envoy for Hostage Affairs (SPEHA).

== Personal life ==
Hernandez has a history of labor activism and enjoys Salsa music.

== See also ==
- Political prisoners in Venezuela
