= Emad Shargi =

Iranian-American businessman and political prisoner

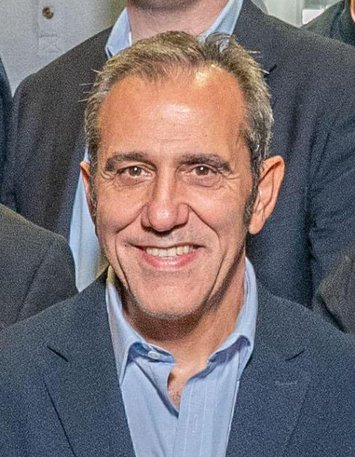
Image of Emad Shargi

Emad Shargi is an Iranian-American businessman. On April 23, 2018, during a trip to Iran, Shargi and his wife were taken into custody by Iranian authorities and held in Evin prison. A Shargi family spokesman said Emad Shargi was taken to a Tehran court on November 30, 2020, where he was informed that he had been convicted of espionage without a trial. He was sentenced to 10 years in prison for espionage and providing military information to foreign countries. Iran does not recognize dual citizenship, depriving prisoners like Shargi of consular assistance and diplomatic access.

The families of the American nationals imprisoned in Iran called for the Biden administration to prioritize their return in negotiations. His daughters, Hannah Shargi and Ariana Shargi, appeared in multiple interviews concerning their father's imprisonment and pleading for the U.S. government to take action, as well as his sister, Neda Shargi. A U.S. official said the Biden administration is treating the issue of the detainees independently from the Iran nuclear deal negotiations and is trying to resolve it as soon as possible.

In 2022, Emad's sister, Neda, joined the steering committee of the Bring Our Families Home campaign to further raise awareness of Emad's detention and other Americans deemed hostages or wrongful detainees.

Emad was ultimately freed from imprisonment in Iran on September 18, 2023, as part of an Iran–United States prisoner release deal mediated by Qatar. He arrived back on American soil in early morning on Tuesday, September 19, 2023, in Washington, D.C.

== See also ==
- List of foreign nationals detained in Iran
- Human rights in the Islamic Republic of Iran
