= Foreign hostages in Afghanistan =

Kidnapping and hostage taking has become a common occurrence in Afghanistan following the U.S. invasion of Afghanistan in 2001. Kidnappers include Taliban and Al-Qaeda fighters and common criminal elements.

The following is a list of known foreign hostages in Afghanistan.

== Australia ==
=== Released (3) ===
- Diana Thomas and Peter Bunch, arrested by the Taliban in August 2001 in connection with her work for Christian aid organization Shelter Now, held in captivity until November 15, 2001.
- Timothy John Weeks, a professor, was kidnapped along with American professor Kevin King by the Taliban on August 7, 2016, while traveling in Kabul. Their driver and bodyguard were not taken. Weeks was released by the Taliban along with King in November 2019 as part of a prisoner swap.

== Bangladesh ==
=== Released (8) ===
- Noor Islam, an aid worker for the Bangladesh Rural Advancement Committee, was kidnapped on September 15, 2007, in Lowgar Province. On December 8, 2007, he was freed by the abductors.
- Seven employees of the Samwhan Corporation were kidnapped by the Taliban near Mazar-i-Sharif on December 17, 2010. Two were released on Dec. 19. The other five, Imam Uddin, Mahbub Ali, Aminul Islam, "Lablu" and Mojibur Rahman, were released on August 2, 2011

== Burma ==
=== Released (1) ===
- A Red Cross worker was kidnapped by the Taliban along with two Afghans and a Macedonian citizen in Wardak Province on September 26, 2007, while working to secure the release of the German hostage Rudolf Blechschmidt. They were freed on September 29, 2007.

== Canada ==
=== Released (2) ===
- Mellissa Fung, a CBC journalist, was kidnapped by armed men from a refugee camp outside of Kabul on October 12, 2008. Her translator and driver were not taken. Fung was released on November 8, 2008.
- Colin Mackenzie Rutherford, a tourist, was kidnapped by the Taliban in late October 2010. He appeared in a hostage video in May 2011. The Government of Canada announced his release on January 11, 2016.

=== Rescued (1) ===
- Joshua Ainslie Boyle was kidnapped along with his American wife Caitlan Connemara Coleman by the Taliban in October 2012 in Wardak province. Coleman was seven months pregnant at the time and gave birth three times in captivity. The couple appeared in two hostage videos sent to their families in 2013, and reappeared in new video footage in 2016, although it was not known when the video was taken. Boyle, Coleman, and their three children were rescued by Pakistan forces on October 11, 2017. Boyle was previously married to Zaynab Khadr, of the notable Egyptian-Canadian family.

== China ==
=== Released (3) ===
- Eng. Sink, a worker for a Chinese road building firm was kidnapped along with his Afghan driver, Lala Gan, by unknown militants on June 29, 2008, while driving towards his company's camp in Wardak Province. Gan was freed two days later. Sink was freed on July 27, 2008.
- Zhang Fengqiang, an engineer, and Wu Yulin, a worker, were kidnapped along with their two Afghan drivers and two Afghan guards by the Taliban on January 16, 2010 as they were working on a road project in Afghanistan's northern province of Faryab. The Afghans were freed three days later after negotiations with tribal elders. Fenggiang and Yulin were freed on April 24, 2010.

== Denmark ==
=== Released (1) ===
- Nagieb Kahja, a Danish-Afghan journalist, was kidnapped in Kunar Province by the Taliban on July 25, 2007. On the same day Nagieb Kahja was freed after few hours in captivity.

== France ==
=== Released (8) ===
- Eric Damfreville and Céline Cordelier, workers for Terre d'Enfance, were kidnapped with three Afghan aid workers by the Taliban on April 3, 2007 in Nimruz Province. Cordelier was released on April 28, 2007, Damfreville was released on May 11, 2007 and the three aid workers were released on May 21, 2007.
- Johan Freckhaus, a businessman, was abducted in the Gailan District of Ghazni Province on May 29, 2008. He was released safely along with two Afghan colleagues on June 19, 2008.
- Two employees of the French aid organisation Action Contre La Faim (ACF) were taken hostage by gunmen on July 18, 2008. They were freed on August 1, 2008.
- Dany Egreteau, an education specialist who worked for the non-governmental organisation Solidarité Laïque, was kidnapped by the Taliban in Kabul on November 3, 2008. Another Frenchman managed to escape. An Afghan man who tried to stop the abduction was shot dead. Egreteau was released on December 3, 2008.
- Stephane Taponier and Herve Ghesquiere, journalists for France 3, were taken hostage along with their translator, editorial fixer and driver by the Taliban on December 30, 2009. They were freed along with their translator on June 29, 2011. Their driver and editorial fixer were freed a few weeks earlier.
- Unnamed aid worker: A French hostage working for Acted, age 30, was freed on November 28, 2012, by kidnappers in Kabul, a spokesman for France's foreign ministry said, on April 8, 2013.

=== Escaped (1) ===
- Pierre Borghi, a twenty-nine-year-old freelance photojournalist, escaped after four months in captivity. Kidnapped in Kabul on November 28, 2012, he resurfaced in Wardak province and was taken by police to Kabul on April 8, 2013.

== Germany ==
=== Released (3) ===
- Norbert W., an engineer of a U.S. construction company, was kidnapped along with his Afghan translator by criminals on June 28, 2007, in Farah Province. After a $40,000 ransom was paid, they were released one week later, on July 5, 2007.
- Rudolf Blechschmidt, an engineer, was kidnapped by the group of Taliban warlord Mullah Nissam Udin on July 18, 2007, along with his colleague Ruediger Diedrich and six Afghans in Wardak Province. One of the Afghans was eventually allowed to "escape" after his family paid a ransom. Diedrich was later killed. Blechschmidt was released on September 26, 2007, but was recaptured shortly thereafter. Rudolf and the other five Afghans were finally released on October 10, 2007, after Germany had paid a 600,000 ransom and the Afghan government had released five Taliban prisoners.
- Käthe B., working for German government aid agency GIZ, was kidnapped by two gunmen at gunpoint in Kabul on August 17, 2015. She was released on October 17, 2015.

=== Killed (2) ===
- Ruediger Diedrich, an engineer, was kidnapped by the group of Taliban warlord Mullah Nissam Udin on July 18, 2007, along with his colleague Rudolf Blechschmidt in Wardak Province. Diedrich was found dead of gunshot wounds on July 21, 2007.
- Harald Kleber, who worked for Gruenhelme, was kidnapped by unknown gunmen in Herat Province on December 16, 2007. On March 14, 2008, it was reported that the abductors demanded $50,000 ransom for his release. The abductors had initially demanded $100,000 for his release but decreased the amount. Kleber was killed sometime after that because the ransom they demanded was not paid.

=== Rescued (3) ===
- Christina Meier, an aid worker for Ora International, was kidnapped in Kabul on August 18, 2007, and appeared on a video the next day calling for the release of prisoners. Christina was freed on August 19, 2007, after Norwegian special forces helped Afghan National Police in storming the kidnappers' hiding place in Kabul.
- Hadschi Asisullah, a German-Afghan businessman, was kidnapped in Kabul on July 25, 2008. He was freed by Afghan intelligence agents in Parwan Province on August 7, 2008. Three abductors were arrested.
- Stefan E., an aid worker, was kidnapped on April 19, 2015, by the Taliban. He was rescued by Afghan police on May 29, 2015.

== India ==
=== Released (3) ===
- Pemmasani Murali and Gonem Varadaiah, construction workers for B. Seenaiah & Company, were kidnapped by Taliban gunmen on December 6, 2003. They were released on December 24, 2003.
- Sarang Mohammad Naeem, working for a Dubai-based company, was kidnapped along with his Nepali colleague and their Afghan driver on April 21, 2008, in Herat Province. The driver was later released. Naeem and his colleague were freed on May 18, 2008.

=== Killed (2) ===
- Maniappan Raman Kutty, an engineer working for Border Road Organisation, was kidnapped with his Afghan driver and two Afghan bodyguards by the Taliban on November 19, 2005. The driver and two bodyguards were later released but Maniappan was found nearly decapitated on November 23, 2005.
- Kasula Suryanarayana, a telecommunications worker for Al-Moayed, was kidnapped along with his Afghan driver by the Taliban on April 28, 2006. The driver was later released but Kasula was found beheaded on April 30, 2006.

== Iraq ==
=== Released (1) ===
- Ghaith Abdul-Ahad, on assignment for The Guardian, was kidnapped on December 10, 2009 along with two Afghan journalists. All three were released on December 16.

== Iran ==
=== Released (12) ===
- Twelve engineers were abducted along with three Afghans in Farah Province near the border with Iran. They were released three days later

== Italy ==
=== Released (3) ===
- Clementina Cantoni, a worker for CARE International, was kidnapped in Kabul on May 16, 2005, apparently by a criminal gang. Her driver was not taken. Cantoni was released on June 9, 2005.
- Gabriele Torsello, a freelance journalist, was kidnapped in Helmand Province on October 12, 2006. His Afghan translator was not taken. Torsello was released on November 3, 2006.
- Daniele Mastrogiacomo, a journalist, was kidnapped on March 5, 2007 by the Taliban, along with his Afghan translator, Ajmal Naqshbandi, and Afghan driver, Sayed Agha. Naqshbandi and Agha were later beheaded. Mastrogiacomo was released on March 19, 2007 in exchange for five Taliban commanders.

== Japan ==
=== Killed (3) ===
- Jun Fukusho and Shinobu Hasegawa, two teachers who wanted to go sightseeing in Afghanistan, went missing after entering the country on August 8, 2005. They were found dead on September 1, 2005.
- Kazuya Ito, 31, and his Afghan driver-translator were abducted on August 26, 2008, as he was on his way to inspect an irrigation project in the area. The driver-translator was later released. Ito's body was found on August 27, 2008.

=== Released (1) ===
- Kosuke Tsuneoka, journalist, was kidnapped in the northern city of Kunduz between March 31 and April 2, 2010. His captors demanded a ransom. He was released September 5, 2010.

== North Macedonia ==
=== Killed (4) ===
- Fadil Zenuni, Lulzam Fidani, Besim Aliu and Sabid Tahiri, employees of Ecolog, were kidnapped along with four Afghans on March 11, 2006. The four Afghans were later released but the four Macedonians were found dead on March 20, 2006.

=== Released (1) ===
- A Red Cross worker was kidnapped by Taliban along with two Afghans and a Burmese citizen in Wardak Province on September 26, 2007, while working to secure the release of the German hostage Rudolf Blechschmidt. They were freed on September 29, 2007.

== Nepal ==
=== Released (1) ===
- Karna Bahadur Gurung, working for a Dubai-based company, was along with his Indian colleague and their driver on April 21, 2008, in Herat Province. The driver was later freed. Gurung and his colleague were freed on May 18, 2008.

== Netherlands ==
=== Released (2) ===
- Joanie de Rijke, a journalist, was kidnapped by the Taliban on November 1, 2008. She was released on November 7, 2008.
- Peter Oosterhuis was kidnapped along with his Afghan driver in the Khan Abad district on October 25, 2010. They were released on December 2, 2010.

== Norway ==
=== Released (1) ===
- Journalist Pål Refsdal and his interpreter were abducted on November 5, 2009 near the Pakistani border. Both were freed on the night of November 11, 2009.

== Philippines ==
=== Released (1) ===
- Angelito Nayan, a diplomat working for the U.N., was kidnapped with two other workers on October 30, 2004. He was freed on November 23, 2004.

== Kosovo ==
=== Released (1) ===
- Shqipe Habibi, a U.N. worker from Kosovo, was kidnapped on October 30, 2004, with two other workers. Habibi was freed on November 23, 2004.

== South Korea ==
=== Killed (2) and Rescued (23) ===
- 23 Christian aid workers, 16 women and seven men, were kidnapped by the Taliban on July 19, 2007. Two male hostages were killed. The other captives were freed on August 30, 2007. See 2007 South Korean hostage crisis in Afghanistan.
- Two construction workers, along with their local driver and two bodyguards, were kidnapped in Samangan province on December 13, 2010. They were later freed by local police.

== Turkey ==
=== Released (7) ===
- Hassan Onal, an engineer working on a highway, was kidnapped along with his Afghan driver by the Taliban in southern Afghanistan on October 30, 2003. The driver was freed a day later. Hassan was released on November 30, 2003.
- Gokhan Gul and Erhan Gunduz, two engineers working at a construction project, were kidnapped along with their Afghan driver by a group of gunmen in Herat Province on July 14, 2008. They were released on July 20, 2008.
- Four engineers were kidnapped along with their driver in Paktia province on December 26, 2010. The driver was released a few days later. The engineers were released on September 4, 2011.

== United Kingdom ==
=== Rescued (1) ===
- Stephen Farrell, reporter for The New York Times, was kidnapped along with his Afghan interpreter, Sultan Manadi, by the Taliban while visiting the site of a deadly NATO airstrike in northern Afghanistan on September 5, 2009. His driver managed to escape. Farrell was the second NY Times reporter to be kidnapped by the Taliban. Farrell was rescued by British commandos on September 9, 2009. Manadi was killed during the rescue effort.

=== Killed (2) ===
- David John Addison, a security contractor, was kidnapped by the Taliban in western Afghanistan on August 31, 2005. His body was found on September 3, 2005.
- Linda Norgrove, an aid worker for the aid group Development Alternatives Inc was kidnapped along with three Afghan colleagues by the Taliban on September 26, 2010 in Kunar Province. The three Afghans were released on October 3, 2010. Norgrove was killed by friendly fire during a botched rescue attempt on October 8, 2010.

=== Released (2) ===
- Sean Langan, a journalist for Channel 4, was kidnapped along with his Afghan translator by the Taliban on the border of Afghanistan and Pakistan on March 22, 2008. They were released on June 21, 2008.
- Annetta Flanigan, a U.N. worker, was kidnapped with two other U.N. workers on October 30, 2004. She was freed with the others on November 23, 2004.

== United States ==
=== Killed (1) ===
- Cydney Mizell, an aid worker, was kidnapped along with her Afghan driver Muhammad Hadi on January 26, 2008, in a residential neighborhood of Kandahar. On February 26, 2008, it was reported that the two were killed. The organization they worked for says the two are believed to be dead.

=== Rescued (2) ===
- Caitlan Connemara Coleman was kidnapped along with her Canadian husband Joshua Ainslie Boyle by the Taliban in October 2012. Coleman was seven months pregnant at the time and gave birth three times in captivity. The couple appeared in two hostage videos sent to their families in 2013. In November 2015, Coleman's family received a letter from her stating she had given birth to a second son in captivity. In December 2016 video footage emerged of her and husband and two children born in captivity. Coleman, Boyle and their three children were rescued by Pakistani forces on October 11, 2017.
- An American (name withheld), working for the Army Corps of Engineers, was abducted along with his Afghan partner on August 20, 2008, by members of the Hezb-i-Islami (Party of Islam) militant group of Gulbuddin Hekmatyar. The Afghan was released five days later after a ransom was paid. The American was rescued on October 15, 2008, by U.S. Special Forces soldiers conducting a nighttime operation.

=== Released (3) ===
- Kevin King, a professor, was kidnapped along with Australian professor Timothy John Weeks by the Taliban on August 7, 2016, while traveling in Kabul. Their driver and bodyguard were not taken. King was released by the Taliban along with Weeks in November 2019 as part of a prisoner swap.
- Safi Rauf, working with Human First, was kidnapped along with his brother Anees Khalil, by the Taliban in December 2021. Rauf was carrying out humanitarian work in Kabul at the time of his abduction. Rauf and his brother were held by the Taliban until April 2022, where they were released following negotiations by the Biden administration.
- Mark Randall Frerichs, a contractor, was kidnapped by the Taliban on January 31, 2020 in Kabul. He was released in exchange for Bashir Noorzai on September 19, 2022.
- Jere van Dyk, a journalist, was kidnapped in 2008 and was released later that year.

=== Escaped (1) ===
- David Stephenson Rohde, a reporter for The New York Times, was kidnapped by the Taliban outside Kabul on November 10, 2008, along with his Afghan translator, Tahir Ludin, and Afghan driver, Asadullah Mangal. He and Ludin managed to escape on June 19, 2009, after seven months in captivity by climbing over the wall of the compound where they were being held in the North Waziristan region of Pakistan. Mangal was left behind but he managed to escape on July 27, 2009.

=== Unknown (1) ===
- Paul Edwin Overby Jr., an author, was last heard from in May 2014, in Khost, Afghanistan, when he was on his way to Waziristan in Pakistan's Federally Administered Tribal Areas, to interview Sirajuddin Haqqani. The Taliban have officially denied any involvement in Overby's disappearance.

== See also ==
- Foreign hostages in Iraq
- Foreign hostages in Pakistan
- Foreign hostages in Nigeria
- Foreign hostages in Somalia
