= 2022 US–Afghan prisoner exchange =

On September 19, 2022, a prisoner exchange was conducted between the United States and Afghanistan, led by the Taliban-controlled government, in which Mark Frerichs, an American contractor was released in exchange for Bashir Noorzai, an Afghan tribal leader and convicted former drug lord close to Mullah Omar, the founder of the Taliban.

== Background ==
=== Mark Frerichs ===
Mark Frerichs is an American engineer and former US Navy diver. Born in 1962, he was director of International logistical support, visiting Afghanistan multiple times since 2012.

In January 2020, Frerichs disappeared in Kabul, Afghanistan's capital. Around a week later, US intelligence officials tracked his cell phone and raided a village near where he disappeared. Although some individuals were arrested, the raid was unproductive. The next month, Newsweek reported that officials had confirmed that Frerichs had been taken captive by the Haqqani network, an Afghan group closely affiliated with the Taliban. In May 2020, the FBI offered a $1 million reward for information that helps lead to Frerichs's release or rescue. The Rewards for Justice Program offered a $5 million reward for information about his location.

In April 2022, a video clip was released that showed Frerichs pleading for help. In the same month, he US State Department launched an inquiry into the release of Frerichs, which was ultimately inconclusive.

=== Bashir Noorzai ===
Bashir Noorzai is an Afghan who participated in fighting Soviet forces during the Soviet–Afghan War. He was an early supporter of the Taliban, and had close ties with the movement's founder and first leader, Mullah Omar.

In April 2005, American authorities in New York City arrested Noorzai. He was charged with trying to smuggle more than $50 million worth of heroin into the United States. He was sentenced to life in prison.

== Prisoner exchange ==
=== Negotiations ===
In 2020, after the US–Taliban deal was signed, Frerichs's sister Charlene Cakora criticized the American government for signing a peace deal with the Taliban that did not involve the release of her brother.

In November 2020 then-secretary of state Mike Pompeo traveled to Afghanistan to personally participate in peace negotiations with the Taliban. The New York Times said that it was unknown whether Pompeo raised Frerichs's captivity during the talks.

=== Release ===
On September 19, 2022, the prisoner exchange took place in Kabul airport. In Kabul, Noorzai was "welcomed with a hero's fanfare" by a number of Taliban officials. The White House confirmed that Frerichs was in Qatar, with an official telling reporters that he is in "stable health and has been offered a range of support options".

== Reactions ==
Joe Biden, the American president said that Frerichs' release was the culmination of work by American officials and other governments. In a statement, he said, "Bringing the negotiations that led to Mark’s freedom to a successful resolution required difficult decisions, which I did not take lightly."

Amir Khan Muttaqi, the acting Afghan Foreign Minister, spoke at a press conference with Noorzai: "After long negotiations, US citizen Mark Frerichs was handed over to an American delegation, and that delegation handed over (Noorzai) to us today at Kabul airport. "We are happy that at Kabul International Airport, in the capital of Afghanistan, we witnessed the wonderful ceremony of one of our compatriots returning home."
