= Ivan Fisher =

American lawyer

Ivan S. Fisher
- Born: August 26, 1943 (age 82); New York City
- Occupation: Attorney

Ivan Stephan Fisher (born 1943) has been a prominent New York City criminal defense attorney. He represents white-collar clients and others targeted or charged in complex federal matters. In 1980, The New York Times listed him in the top five of criminal attorneys in New York City and in a separate article described him as "one of the nation's most sought-after and highly paid criminal lawyers". The New Yorker has called him one of "Manhattan's leading attorneys". John Kroger, former attorney general of Oregon, described Fisher in 2008 as "one of the top defense attorneys in the nation ... and without question a brilliant trial lawyer". Fisher has been the recipient of many honors including being invited to address the United States Second Circuit Federal Judicial Conference.

== Career ==
Fisher attended the Horace Mann School, Syracuse University and Boston University School of Law. Early in his career he was a partner of Albert Krieger.

As a young lawyer, Fisher represented the writer Jack Henry Abbott in a murder trial in what many call "the trial of the decade" and was counsel for Joseph Bonanno also known as "Joey Bananas", the boss of the Bonanno crime family. Another of his clients was Marie Luisi, a senior vice president at J.Walter Thompson, amid allegations relating to the alleged theft of $30 million and Lowell Birrell, an oil executive and financier in the largest white collar prosecution ever at the time.

Fisher also represented the Italian financier Michele Sindona, was lead counsel in the Pizza Connection Trial, the longest federal criminal trial in US history and the French Connection trial.

On May 15, 1974, Fisher won a landmark decision in the Court of Appeals in the 2nd Circuit, United States vs. Toscanino, which in effect overruled Supreme Court rulings, through its limiting of the Ker–Frisbie doctrine, precluding American judicial review of foreign U.S. law enforcement conduct. An immediate result of the decision was an order from the then secretary of state, Henry Kissinger, to every United States embassy in the world directing all American personnel to abstain from participation in torture.

In recent years, Fisher secured the dismissal of the indictment alleging corruption and related offenses filed against Roy L. Schneider, M.D., the former governor of the United States Virgin Islands. He also won an acquittal at the trial of Demetrios Demetrios, who was alleged to have traded illegally with "black nations". Fisher represented the billionaire Pashtun tribal chieftain and politician Haji Ayub Afridi, whose jurisdiction covers the Khyber-Pakhtunkhwa province of Pakistan; Ayub Afridi has endured a long and complicated relationship with the United States, including a prosecution brought in the United States District Court for the Eastern District of New York.

Fisher defended Alberto Vilar, an investor and billionaire philanthropist, who was head of the asset management firm Amerindo Investment Advisors, against securities fraud charges brought by the U.S. Attorney's Office in the Southern District of New York. Fisher is also counsel to Haji Bashir Noorzai, whose prosecution and subsequent conviction by the U.S. government raised significant issues involving United States foreign policy. In 2009, Fisher represented the General Counsel of a major telecommunications company on charges of stock options backdating.

Fisher has frequently been profiled in major publications such as Time magazine, The New York Times, The National Law Journal and the New York Law Journal. He lectures frequently at leading universities including Yale Law School and Columbia Law School on criminal defense and is widely known as an expert on cross examination. He is regularly called on to give legal commentary on national television.

In 2012, Fisher was suspended from New York federal courts for breach of fiduciary responsibility to a client. On March 14, 2013, the grievance committee of the United States District Court in Manhattan barred Fisher from practicing before that court, based on the committee's finding that Fisher had improperly kept money from a client that Fisher was supposed to use to repay a third party.

On July 9, 2015, Fisher was suspended from the practice of law, and had not renewed his license as of August 2024, according to the New York State Unified Court System website.

== Notable clients ==
- Jack Henry Abbott
- Alberto Vilar
- Governor Roy Schneider
- Norman Mailer
- Michele Sindona
- The French Connection
- Pizza Connection Trial
- Lowell Birrell
- Haji Bashar Noorzai
- Haji Ayub Afridi
- Remy Ma
- Joseph Bonanno
- John Dickinson
