= Harry G. Garland =

American businessman

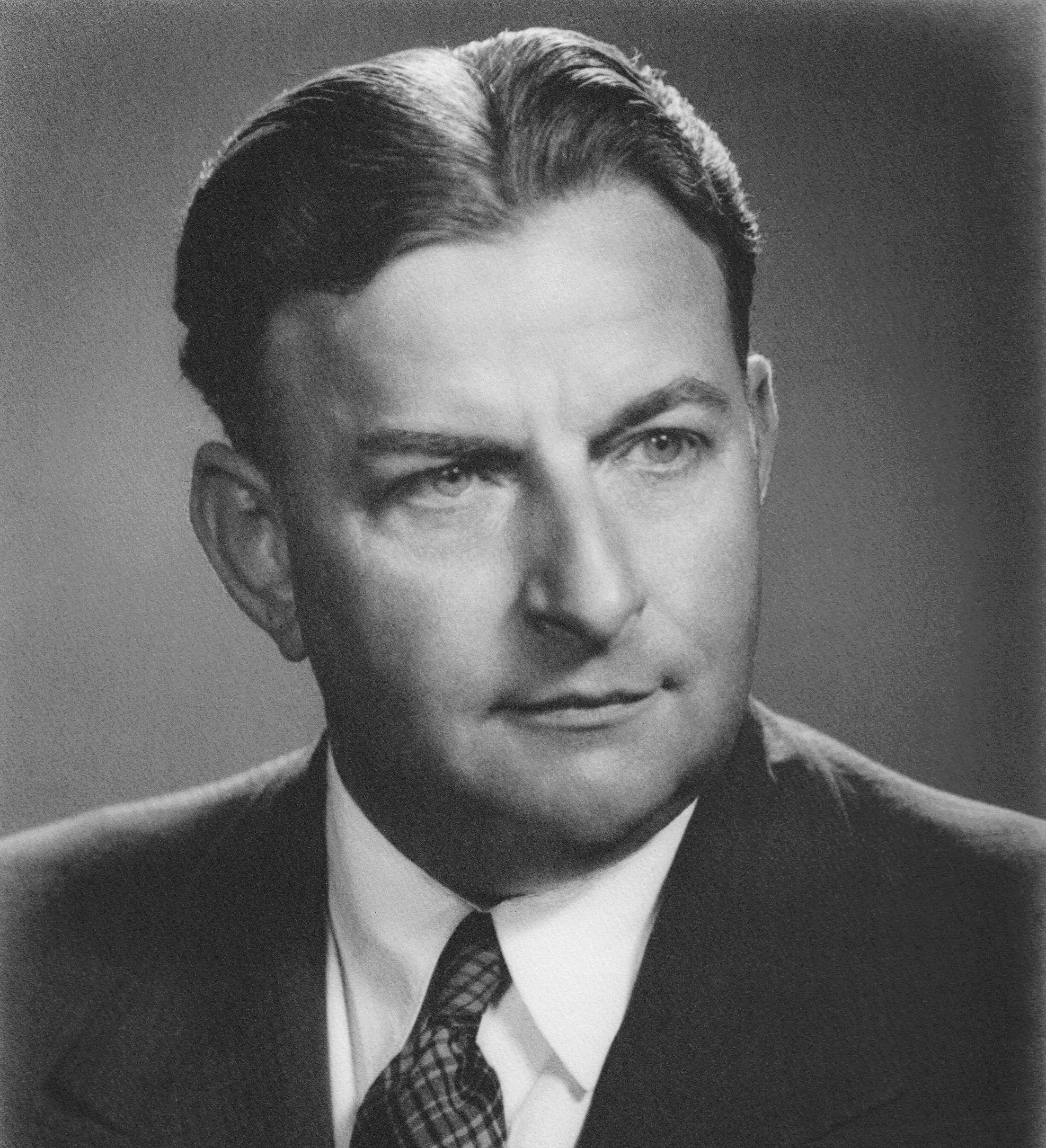
- Harry George Garland
- Born: November 28, 1899; Joliet, Illinois
- Died: June 18, 1972 (aged 72); Detroit, Michigan
- Resting place: Woodlawn Cemetery, Detroit
- Occupation: Manufacturing executive
- Known for: Garland Manufacturing Co.
- Spouse: Rose Garland
- Children: Harry, Judy, Carol
- Parent(s): George Moses Garland; Annie Amilia Elliott
- Call sign: WA8GFP

Harry George Garland (November 28, 1899 – June 18, 1972) was founder and president of Garland Manufacturing Company in Detroit, Michigan, a company that he founded in 1935. As a result of his contributions to the production of equipment for the armed forces during World War II, he was recognized as one of the leaders of wartime Michigan. He sold Garland Manufacturing in 1947 and turned to a career of rescuing financially distressed companies, often as a court-appointed bankruptcy receiver. His receiverships included the Anker-Holth Manufacturing Co., Richmond & Backus Co., D. J. Healy Shops, Rocky River Paper Mill, and the F.L. Jacobs Company. Mr. Garland also served on the Macomb County, Michigan Board of Supervisors for almost 20 years. The Garland Lodge and Resort in Lewiston, Michigan, is named after him.

== Early career ==
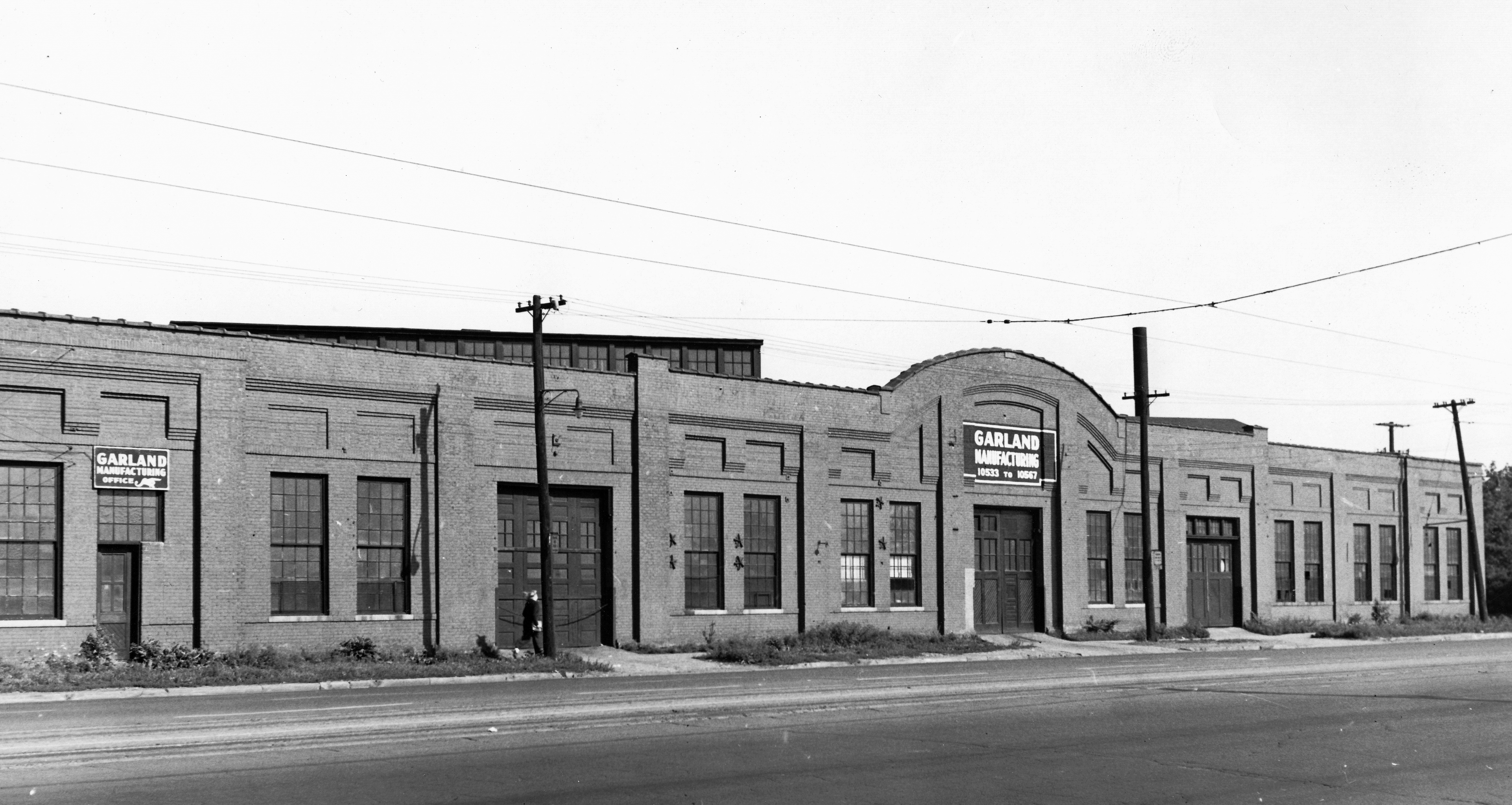
Garland Manufacturing Company on Gratiot Avenue in Detroit, Michigan (c. 1945)

Harry G. Garland learned the trade of tool and die making in the factories of Chicago and Detroit. In 1917 he began his apprenticeship at the American Can Company in Chicago, and worked there for four years. Seeing the opportunities in Michigan, where the automobile industry was in full swing, he moved to Detroit in 1921 to join the Studebaker Company as a journeyman, and in 1923 he moved on to the Chrysler Corporation where he rose to the position of master mechanic at the former Maxwell automobile plant. He left Chrysler in 1935 to start Garland Manufacturing Company.

== Garland Manufacturing Company ==
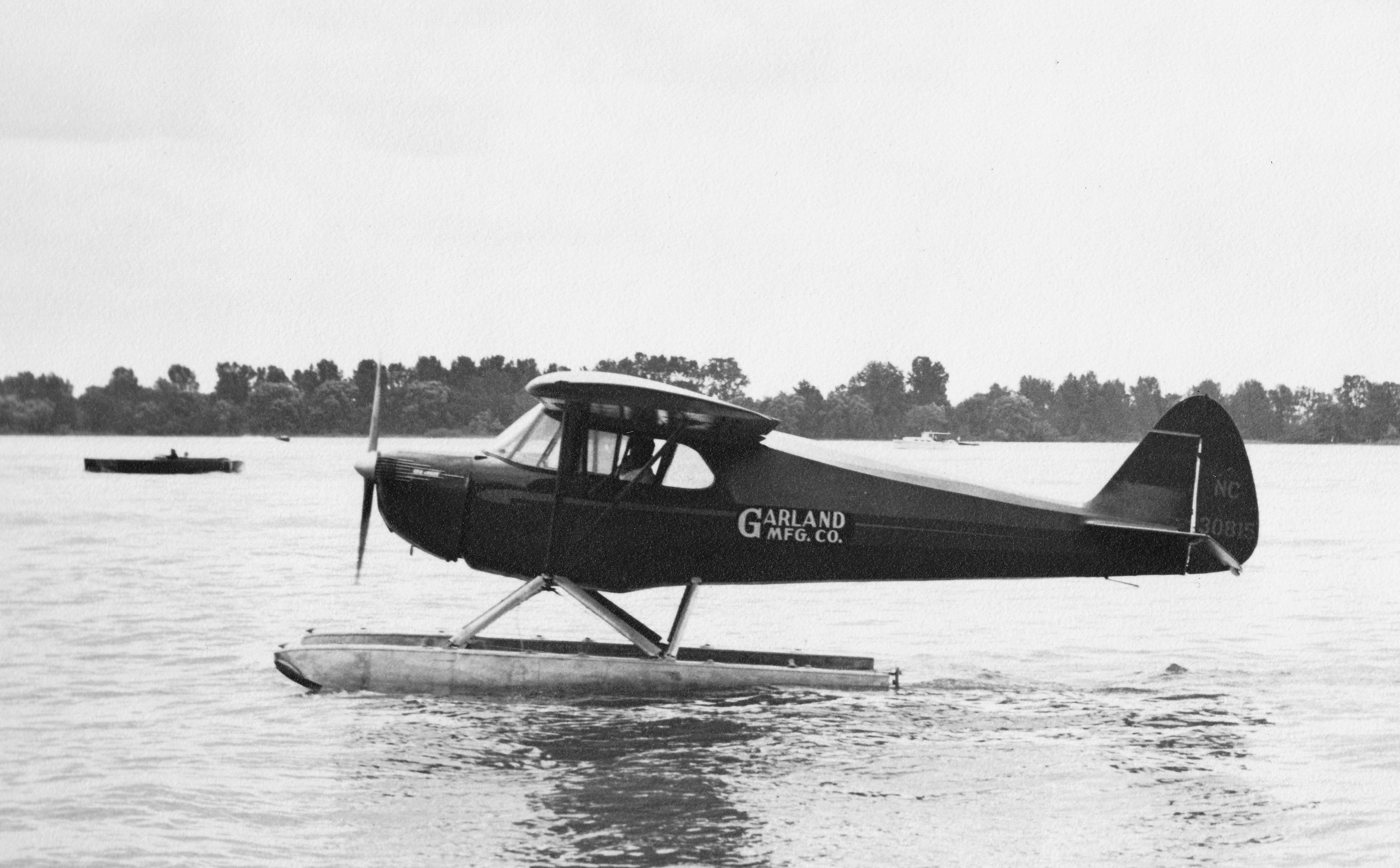
Garland pilots seaplane, with Garland Manufacturing logo, on the Detroit River (1946)

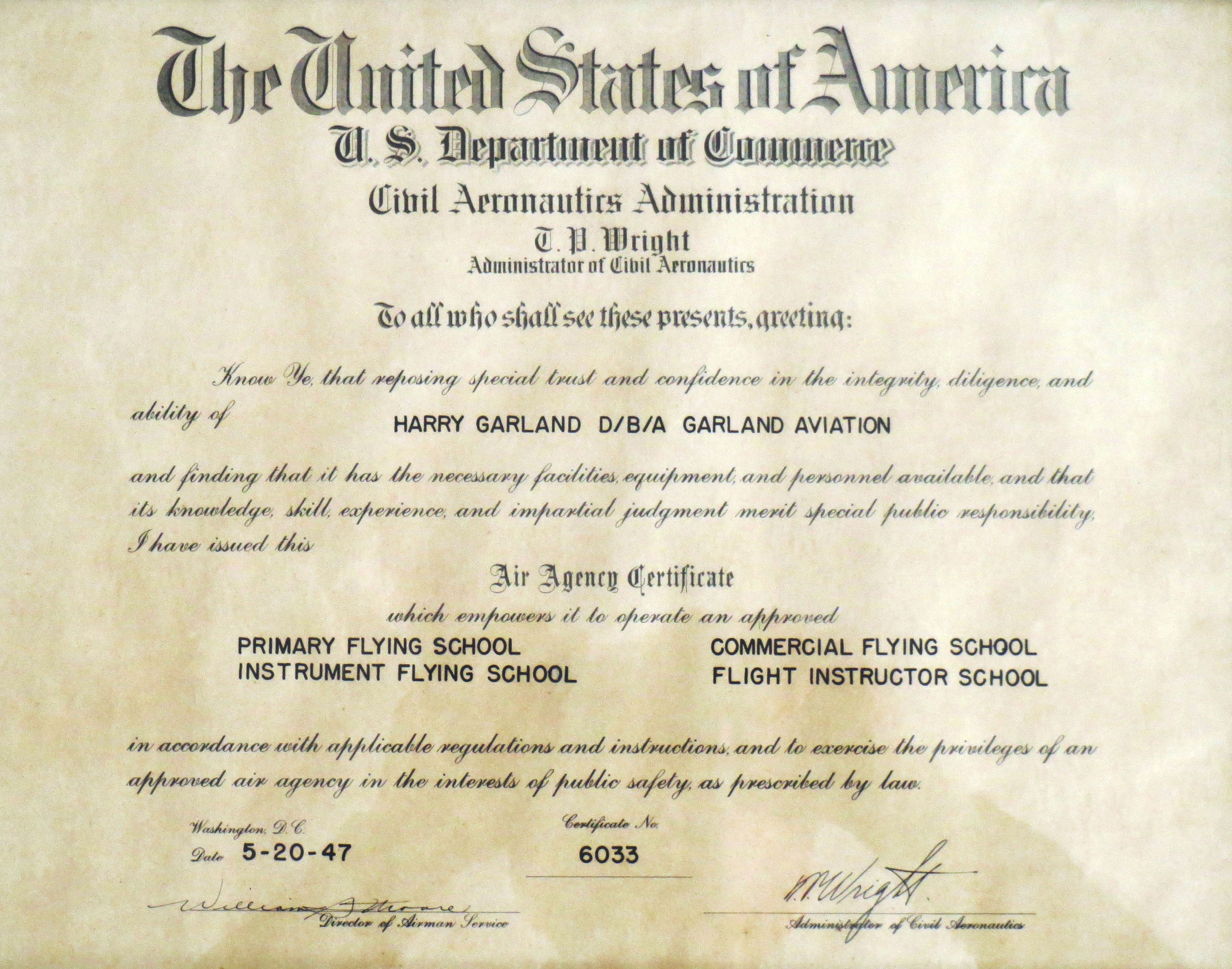
Garland Aviation Air Agency Certificate (1947)

Garland Manufacturing Company was launched by Harry Garland in 1935 as a manufacturer of parts for the automobile industry. The plant was located at 10533 Gratiot Avenue in Detroit. When World War II broke out, Garland Manufacturing turned to the production of parts for trucks, tanks, and planes for the navy and the army. Garland's contribution to the war effort was recognized in the book "Leaders of Wartime Michigan".

Garland was also owner of the Clairpointe Marina on the Detroit River. The Marina was distinguished by the railroad system designed and constructed by Garland for transporting deep-keeled boats from the water to the storage areas and back. He also operated Garland's Seaplane Base, and seaplanes from Garland's Seaplane Base, bearing the Garland Manufacturing Co. logo, could be seen taking off and landing on the Detroit River during the 1940s.

Harry Garland sold Garland Manufacturing Company in 1947 to Herman Otto. Otto developed land owned by Garland Manufacturing in Lewiston, Michigan, into a major resort which opened in 1951. The resort was named after Harry Garland – the Garland Lodge and Resort.

== F.L. Jacobs Co. ==
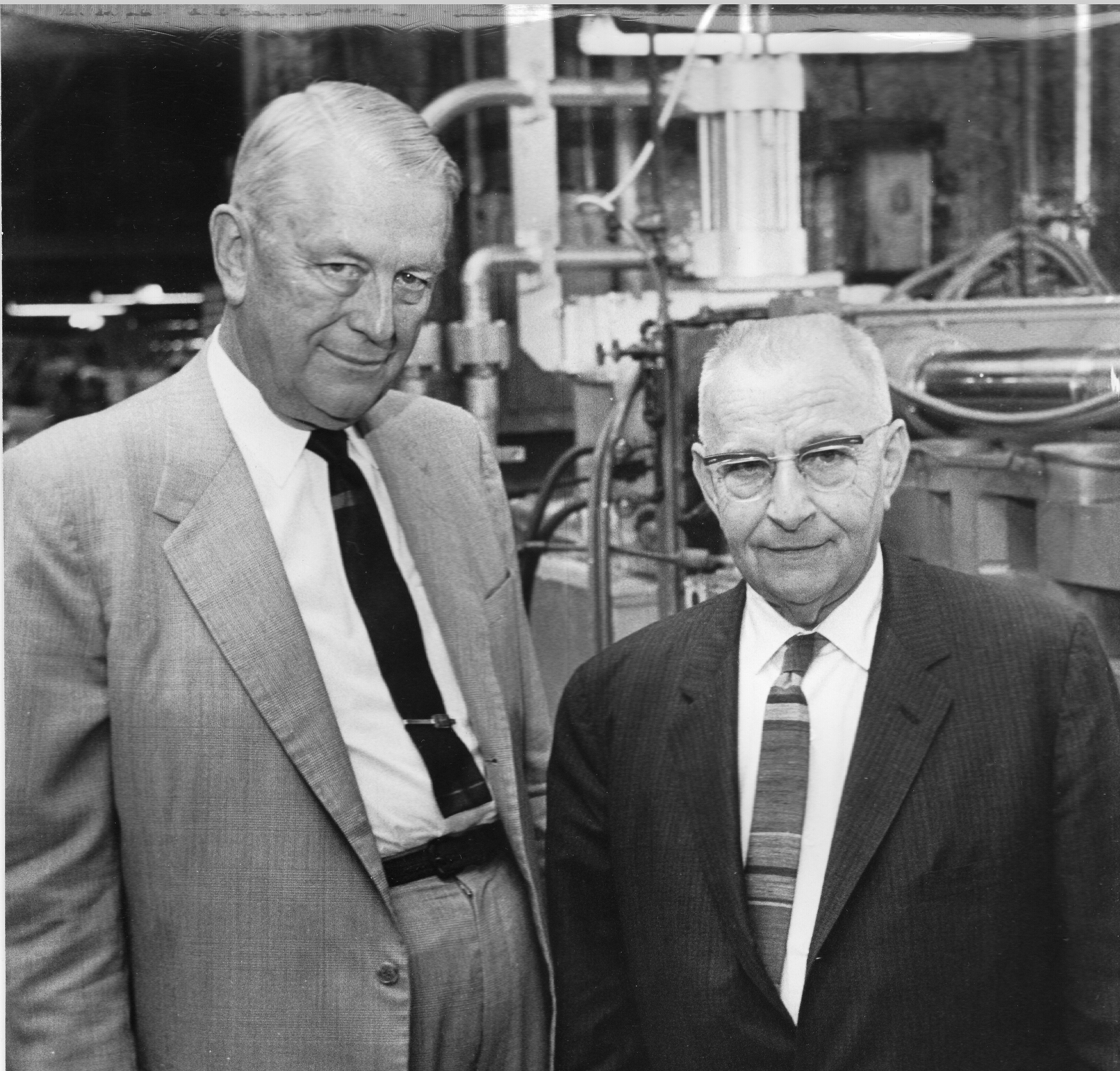
Arthur B. Pfleiderer and Harry G. Garland, Trustees of the F.L. Jacobs Co. (1964)

On March 18, 1959, U.S. District Judge Thomas P. Thornton appointed Harry G. Garland and Arthur B. Pfleiderer as trustees of the F.L. Jacobs Company and ordered the reorganization of the company under Chapter 10 of the Federal bankruptcy law. The bankruptcy of the F.L. Jacobs Company was described as “the nation's fourth largest corporate financing scandal of recent years”. At the time of Judge Thornton's ruling, the F.L. Jacobs Company was headed by Hal Roach Jr. who had taken over the chairmanship of the company from Alexander Guterma in early 1959. In 1960 Guterma was sentenced to prison for his criminal mis-management of the company. The F.L. Jacobs Company had manufacturing plants in Michigan and a lavish New York office that Judge Thornton characterized as "a cesspool of violations".

As Garland and Pleiderer took on the task of untangling the convoluted financial affairs of the F. L. Jacobs Co., Harry Garland assumed the presidency of the two operating units of the company: Grand Rapids Metalcraft Corp. (which had been acquired by F.L. Jacobs in 1936) and Continental Die Casting Corp. At the end of 1959 the Detroit News reported that the losses of these two companies had been cut substantially, and by early 1960 Garland reported that the companies were running "in the black".

While operating Grand Rapids Metalcraft and Continental Die Casting profitably, Garland and Pfleiderer were able to retire the past obligations of the F.L. Jacobs Company and complete the reorganization. In seven years Garland and Pfleiderer took F.L. Jacobs, with a negative net worth of $15.1 million, and returned it to viability. The court, in its final ruling, heaped praise on Harry G. Garland and Arthur B. Pfleiderer noting that Grand Rapids Metalcraft Corp. and Continental Die Casting Corp. had been restored to "leaders in their fields".

As F.L. Jacobs emerged from bankruptcy, Garland was appointed as chairman of the company. Garland continued in this position until 1971 when he resigned the chairmanship in order to, as the Wall Street Journal reported, "turn the reins over to a younger man."

== Other businesses ==
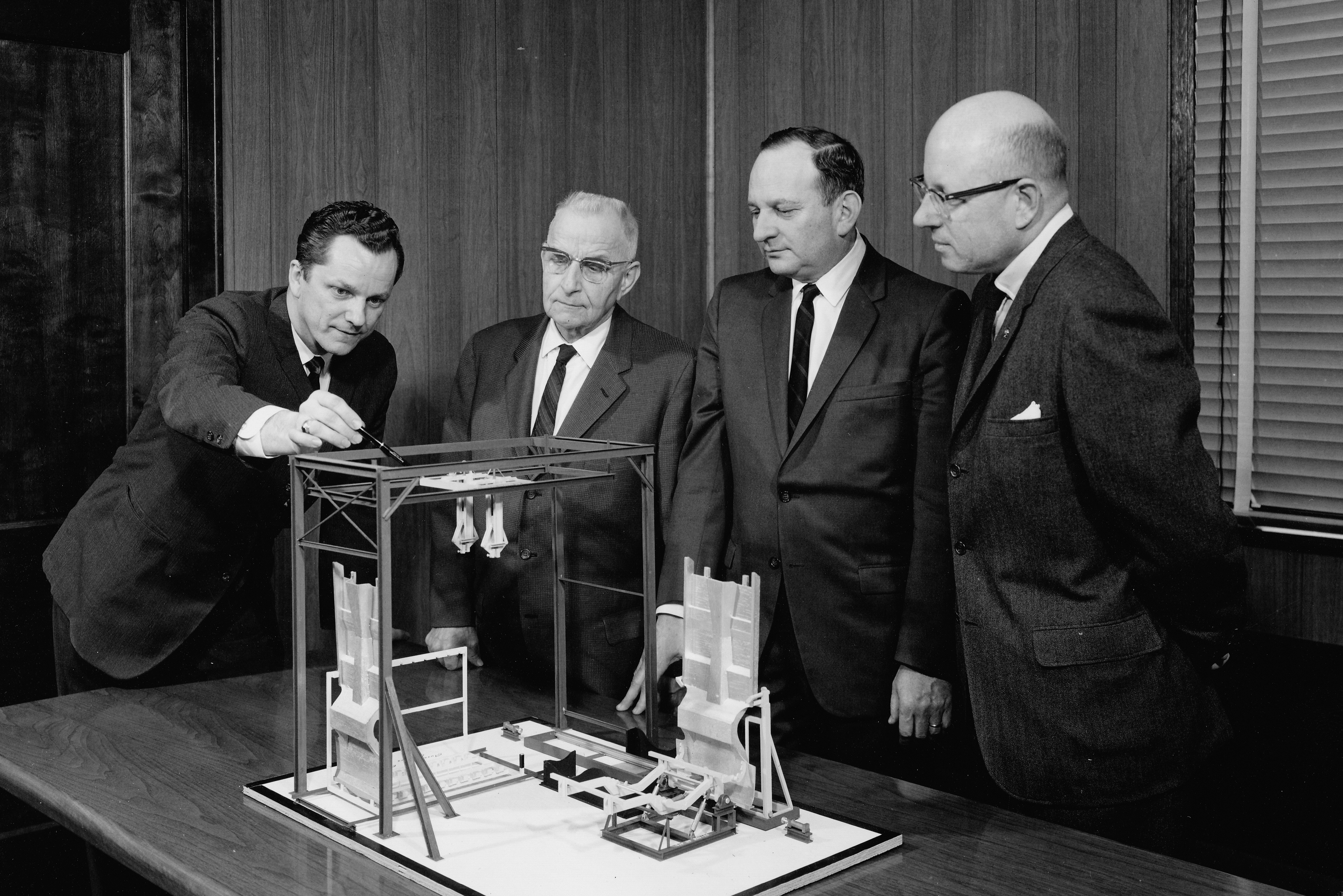
Harry G. Garland with management of Anchor Steel and Conveyor Company in 1965: Ade Czarnecki (Chief Engineer), Harry Garland (President), Marshall Brenner (Vice President and General Manager), Ted Hegelman (Sales Manager).

During the 1960s Harry Garland also served as president of Anchor Steel and Conveyor Company in Dearborn, Michigan. At this company Garland completed the design, construction, and installation of a sophisticated conveyor system that transported huge crowds of visitors through General Motors' Futurama exhibit at the 1964 New York World's Fair. Garland's conveyor system carried 1400 seated visitors simultaneously through the Futurama diorama on a 15-minute ride through scenes of the Antarctic, the moon, the ocean floor, the jungle, mountains, desert, and the urban community of the future. The ride did not need to pause for passenger loading and unloading, as visitors boarded and exited from moving walkways synchronized precisely with the speed of the moving seats. During the course of the World's Fair nearly 26 million visitors were transported by this system. It was the Fair's most popular attraction.

Throughout the 1950s and 1960s, over and above his other corporate responsibilities, Harry Garland served as the representative in the Detroit area for Lake Shore, Inc., a manufacturing company in Michigan's Upper Peninsula. He was credited with establishing Lake Shore, Inc. as a major sub-contractor to the automotive industry.

== Personal life ==
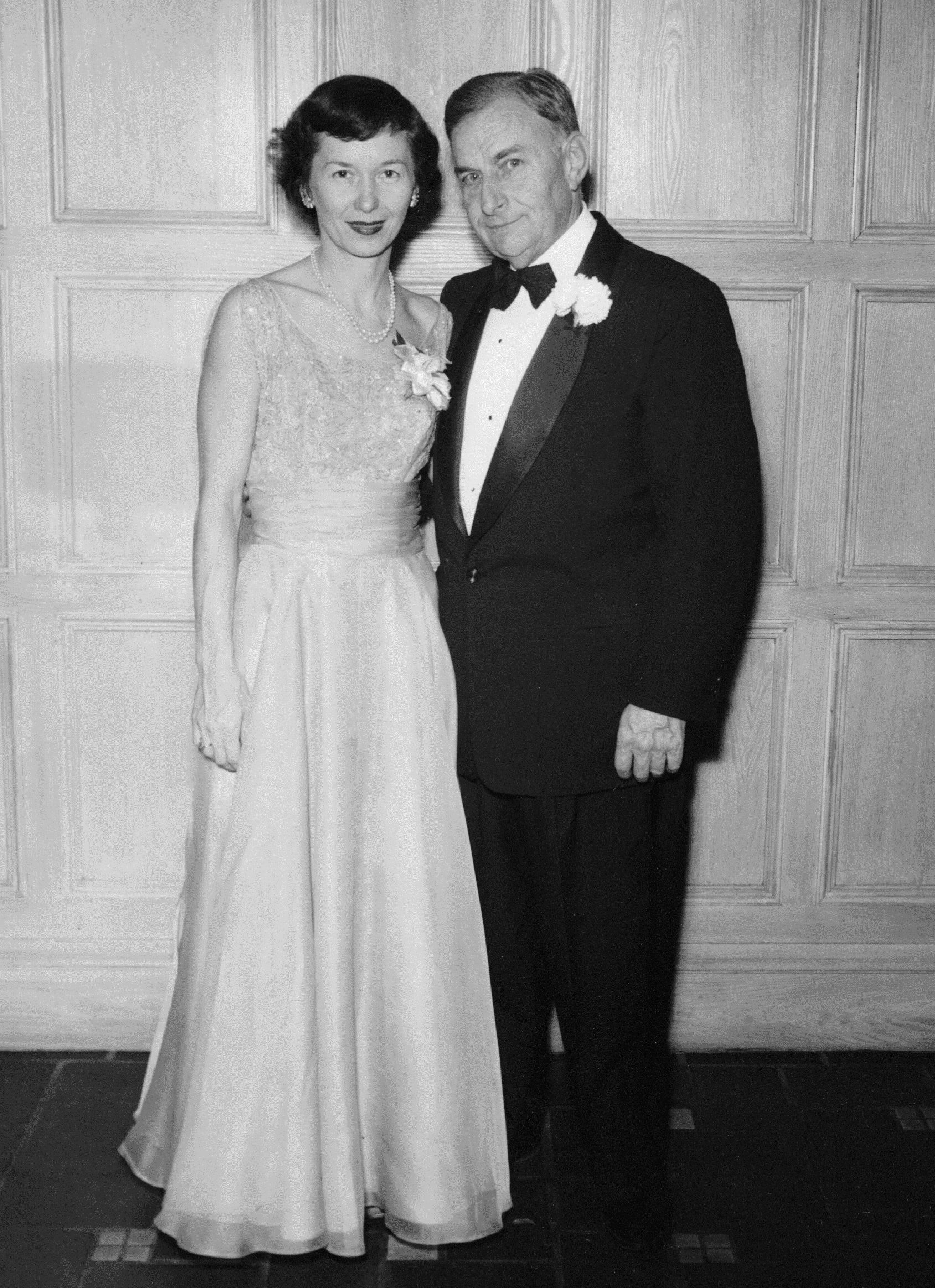
With his wife, Rose Garland, in 1945

Garland was born in Joliet, Illinois, on November 28, 1899. He moved to Detroit in 1921, and spent the rest of his life in the Detroit area. He was an accomplished pilot and yachtsman, active in the Civil Air Patrol, and served on the advisory board of Aviation and Yachting magazine. In 1945 he built his home in Detroit at 14480 Riverside Avenue, located on the Detroit River. He operated a seaplane base and flight school from his home. Garland's seaplane base had both wooden ramps, from which he operated floatplanes, and a concrete ramp from which he could taxi his Grumman Widgeon amphibian into the water.

In 1952 the City of Detroit took possession of Garland's property by eminent domain to convert it into a park, and Garland moved to Grosse Pointe Shores in Lake Township. He built his home at Gaukler Point on the shore of Lake St. Clair and constructed a seaplane ramp from which he operated his Piper PA-18 "Super Cub" floatplane. He replaced Mrs. Edsel Ford on the township board of review and became Supervisor of Lake Township on November 6, 1953, at a time that the township had only 13 registered voters. As Township Supervisor he was a member of the Macomb County Board of Supervisors for nearly 20 years, and served as Chairman of the Airport Committee.

Garland and his wife Rose had three children: Harry (b. 1947), Judy (b. 1949), and Carol (b. 1951). He died on June 18, 1972. His wife Rose continued living in their Grosse Pointe Shores home until her death on April 26, 2014.
