= Paul Overby =

American author (born 1942, disappeared 2014)

- Born: November 27, 1942; Illinois, United States
- Disappeared: May 17, 2014 (aged 71); Waziristan, Pakistan
- Status: Missing for 12 years and 13 days
- Occupation: Author
- Known for: Disappeared mysteriously in Waziristan

Paul Edwin Overby Jr. (born November 27, 1942) is an American author who disappeared on his way to Waziristan, in Pakistan's Federally Administered Tribal Areas, to interview Sirajuddin Haqqani. Overby's wife, Jane Larson, revealed it happened on May 17, 2014. Journalists agreed not to publish his identity until January 2017, when she agreed to make his identity public.

== Biography ==
Overby lived in Portland, Oregon in the 1980s and 1990s, during which time he contributed to The Oregonian on topics including Zanzibar and Afghanistan. He also briefly lived in Zanzibar in that time.

According to Overby, he first traveled to Afghanistan in 1988 to document the mujahideen fighting in the Soviet–Afghan War. He further claimed to have fought alongside them. In 1993, Overby published a book on the Soviet–Afghan War, Holy Blood: An Inside View of the Afghan War.

In 2002, he and his wife moved from New York City to a colonial-era house in Goshen, Massachusetts. Writing for CNN in 2017, Peter Bergen described Overby as being from Western Massachusetts.

== Disappearance ==
Larson had believed Overby had been kidnapped by the Taliban. However, on February 28, 2017, the Taliban released a statement denying that they had kidnapped Overby.

Reporters Without Borders called for his release, on January 27, 2017. On March 19, 2019, journalist David Rohde, a former hostage who had escaped captivity several years before Overby's disappearance, described Overby as still being in captivity.

=== Later events ===
On May 8, 2018, the Federal Bureau of Investigation offered a $1 million reward for information leading to his rescue. In addition, the US government's counterterrorism Rewards for Justice Program offered a $5 million reward for information leading to his location. In May 2026, the United States government issued a statement renewing its call for Overby's return.

== See also ==
- List of kidnappings
- List of people who disappeared mysteriously (2000–present)
