= Safi Rauf =

Afghan-American humanitarian worker

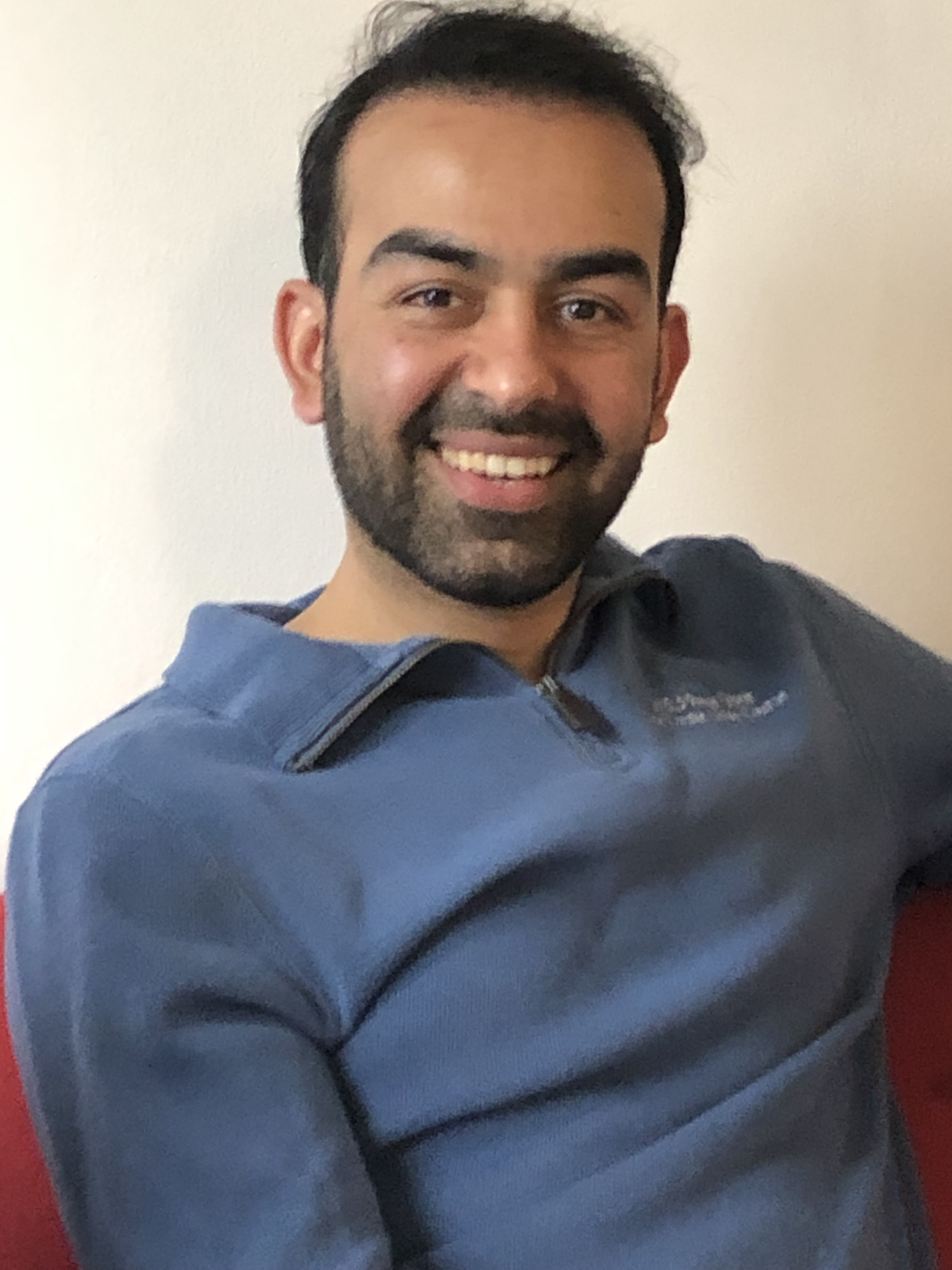
- Portrait of Safi Rauf
- Born: Safiullah Rauf; 1994 (age 31–32); Pakistan
- Education: Georgetown University (BS)
- Occupation: Nonprofit worker

Safiullah Rauf (born 1994) is an Afghan-American nonprofit worker and Navy reservist.

Born in Pakistan, Rauf immigrated to the United States, where he became a hospital corpsman and linguist in the United States Navy. He founded the Human First Coalition, which works to evacuate refugees from Afghanistan. In December 2021, while providing humanitarian aid in Kabul, Rauf was detained by the Taliban and held for 105 days; he was subsequently released in early April 2022, following negotiations between the Taliban and the Biden administration. The Human First Coalition was accused of misconduct in 2022 and sued by one of its former partners.

== Personal life ==
Safi Rauf was born in 1994 in an Afghan refugee camp in Pakistan. In his teenage years, Rauf immigrated to Omaha, Nebraska in the United States where he attended and later graduated from Millard South High School. In 2017, Rauf enlisted in the United States Navy Reserve and has served as a hospital corpsman. Rauf also served as a linguist and cultural advisor with Special Operations Forces in Afghanistan. In 2019, Rauf attended Georgetown University with a pre-med track. Following this, he was admitted to University of Nebraska Medical Center before deferring his acceptance to co-found the Human First Coalition.

Rauf is married to director Sammi Cannold.

== Human First Coalition ==
In 2021, Rauf co-founded the Human First Coalition alongside his brothers Zabih Rauf and Anees Khalil. Human First is an ad hoc organization designed to help aid those fleeing from Afghanistan following the United States' withdrawal from the country. The Human First Coalition is estimated to have rescued over 6,000 people from Afghanistan, including 1,000 Americans and their families, according to Rauf.

In 2022, Rauf advocated for the Afghan Adjustment Act, a bill that aims to help Afghan Afghan evacuees become legal permanent U.S. residents.

=== Taliban captivity ===
In November 2021, following approval from the Taliban and United States government, Safi Rauf and his brother Anees Khalil began humanitarian work in Kabul, helping evacuate Afghans from the country.

On December 18, senior officials from Taliban's General Directorate of Intelligence approached the brothers and requested they provide an interview, claiming that all foreigners were required to provide such. Following this interview, Safi, Anees, and three British nationals were taken captive on suspicion of espionage and were placed "in rooms that were 8 feet by 8 feet, with no phones, blankets, mattresses or sunlight." The brothers stated that during their captivity, both were tortured by their captors; both brothers attempted a hunger strike in a bid to be released. In mid-March, both captees' families were permitted 15 minutes by the Taliban to speak with Safi and Anees.

The American State Department and Biden administration conducted a months-long negotiation effort to secure the release of both brothers. On March 31, the brothers were informed they were going to be released and told their captivity was "a misunderstanding". In total, both were held captive for 105 days and were released into U.S. custody on April 1, 2022. The brothers were flown to a U.S. military base in Qatar before returning to the United States.

=== Accusations of misconduct ===
The United States Institute of Peace sued the Human First Coalition in 2022, stating that although Rauf and the organization had received a $600,000 payment to evacuate USIP personnel from Afghanistan, it failed to do so and did not return the money. Rauf stated that the money had been intended as a donation to Human First and denied having any obligation to return it to USIP. In addition, Sarah Teske, Human First's strategic director for several months in 2021, raised concerns about how money raised was spent, stating that "nobody could tell me where the money was going." An auditing organization hired by Human First to assess the situation reported to have found "red flags" that "could be linked to wire fraud or money laundering." Rauf argued that the existence of the audit demonstrated the good faith of Human First Coalition. Archewell began supporting the Human First Coalition in December 2021 with a grant, but halted further aid after accusations of misconduct arose in February 2023. The organization was also accused by hundreds of Afghan refugees of mistreating them due to the absence of medical care, drinking water, and safe food at the organization's "safe house" in Pakistan.

== See also ==
- Foreign hostages in Afghanistan
- Mark Frerichs
