= Captive (2021 film) =

Canadian documentary film

- Directed by: Mellissa Fung
- Written by: Mellissa Fung
- Produced by: Stuart Coxe; Nida Marji
- Starring: Mellissa Fung
- Cinematography: Duraid Munajim
- Edited by: Jonathan Wong
- Music by: Ohad Benchetrit; Justin Small
- Production company: Antica Productions
- Distributed by: TVOntario
- Release date: February 16, 2021
- Running time: 107 minutes
- Country: Canada
- Language: English

Captive, also known as Fursuna in some releases, is a Canadian documentary film, directed by Mellissa Fung and released in 2021. The film documents the stories of three young Nigerian women who were abducted and held captive by Boko Haram, linking their experiences in part to her own past experience having been abducted by armed bandits in 2008 while covering the War in Afghanistan.

The film had selected theatrical screenings, but due to the ongoing COVID-19 pandemic it was distributed primarily on streaming platforms and with a television broadcast on TVOntario.

The film received a Canadian Screen Award nomination for Best Feature Length Documentary at the 10th Canadian Screen Awards in 2022.
