= Earl Belle =

Earl Fleegler Belle (October 22, 1930 – April 3, 1995) was one of the biggest stock manipulators in the 1950s. He fled the United States to Brazil, but returned after 5 1/2 years and served time in prison for securities fraud. He was called various nicknames by the media due to his youth, including "Boy Wonder" and the "Pittsburgh Whiz Kid."

Earl Belle was born in Pittsburgh, Pennsylvania to Julius and Edith (née Fleegler) Belle. Belle married Fayth Joy Blumenfeld in 1951. He graduated from the University of Pittsburgh in 1956. He began a redevelopment plan for the Borough of Saltsburg, Pennsylvania through Eastern Investment Development Corp. with brothers Murray and Burton Talenfeld, and their father Edward. Belle then became a director of the First National Bank of Saltsburg. Belle and his associates bought control of Cornucopia Gold Mines (listed on the American Stock Exchange) in 1957, and manipulated the stock to buy other companies. The holding company was then named General Kinetics. Belle also purchased a controlling interest in the Manufacturers Bank of Edgewater, New Jersey in April 1958. The bank failed on July 17, 1958, after the discovery of $150,000 in questionable loans to companies controlled by Belle.

Belle fled Pittsburgh on July 4, 1958, eventually winding up in Rio de Janeiro, Brazil, taking an estimated $1 million with him. He was charged, along with his associate Mitchell Ostwind, in July 1958 on 17 counts of conspiracy and violation of Federal statutes on mail fraud and interstate transportation of stolen property. Mitchell Ostwind returned to the United States 10 months later and was convicted in the Edgewater bank fraud case. Brothers Murray and Burton Talenfeld pled guilty in 1961 to 13 charges and no defense to 25 others, and were sentenced to a year in prison and a $20,000 fine. Their father Edward received probation.

Belle was charged with fraud in a Brazilian court involving passing worthless checks, and he voluntarily returned to the United States in December 1963. (In addition, an extradition treaty with Brazil was scheduled to go into effect in December 1964, as Brazil had become a haven for a number of stock swindlers from the United States, like Ben Jack Cage, Lowell Birrell and Edward M. Gilbert.) Belle pleaded guilty to 26 counts of falsifying financial records and fraud and no defense to 18 other counts. He served 22 months of a 30-month sentence for embezzlement. He was released in May 1966. In 1981, Belle again encountered legal difficulties when he was sanctioned by the SEC in connection with dealings with Teletrans Industries, Inc. He also was the subject of lawsuits by a number of German investors in the company. Belle died in Florida in 1995.
