= Kidnapping of David Rohde =

2008 kidnapping in Afghanistan

David Stephenson Rohde, a journalist for The New York Times, and two associates were kidnapped by members of the Taliban in November 2008. Rohde was in Afghanistan doing research for a book. After being held captive for eight months, in June 2009, Rohde and one of his associates escaped and made their way to safety.

During his captivity, Rohde's colleagues at The New York Times appealed to other members of the news media not to publish any stories reporting on the abduction. Their intentions in doing so were to maximize Rohde's chances for survival and/or release.

== Abduction ==
On November 10, 2008, Rohde, his interpreter, Tahir Ludin, and their driver, Asadullah "Asad" Mangal, were abducted outside Kabul, the capital of Afghanistan, while Rohde was researching a book about the history of United States' involvement in the country. He had been invited to interview a Taliban commander in Logar Province near Kabul. The interview had been arranged by Ludin, but the two men never made it to their destination. The Taliban commander called The New York Times to report that they had not arrived. The kidnappers initially insisted on no publicity and issued a series of difficult and unclear demands, including the release of Taliban prisoners being held in Afghanistan and Guantanamo Bay, and the payment of ransoms of tens of millions of dollars. They later released at least two videos showing Rohde, which were sent to Western news outlets and The New York Times. The kidnappers also sent letters and audiotapes as well as making contact by telephone and via the Red Cross.

It is believed that Rohde and his colleagues were being held by the network of Jalaluddin Haqqani, a warlord and former Mujahideen fighter against the Soviet occupation of Afghanistan in the 1980s. Haqqani has been accused by the US of ordering beheadings and suicide bombings, and had a $5 million bounty on his head. The same network is believed to have been responsible for the kidnapping of the Channel 4 reporter Sean Langan in 2008. The Haqqani network is closely allied with the Taliban and shares many of its values.

== Response ==
A coalition of Times staff, private security contractors assisting Rohde's family and US officials worked behind the scenes to secure the men's release, enlisting the help of local Afghan journalists to lobby the Taliban. Richard Holbrooke, then US envoy to South Asia, Secretary of State Hillary Clinton and her predecessor Condoleezza Rice were also involved in the efforts to liberate Rohde and his colleagues. Contact was established with the kidnappers within days of the men's disappearance. Negotiations proved slow and inconclusive, but the captors reportedly signaled early on that they would not kill Rohde, though the captives themselves were regularly threatened with death.

== Escape ==
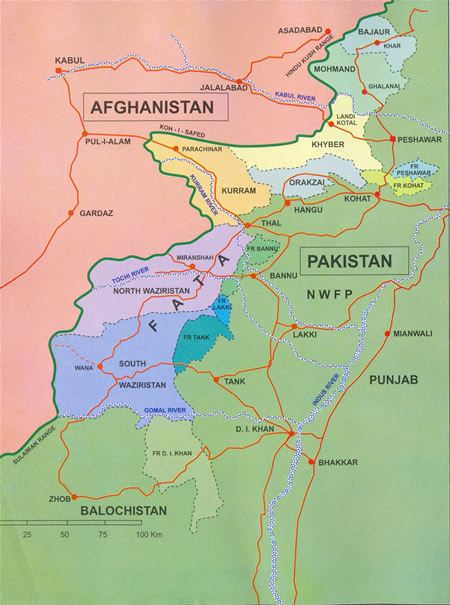
North Waziristan (light purple), on the Pakistani border, where the captives were transferred.

At some point after their abduction, the men were transferred across the border to a Taliban compound near Miranshah in the North Waziristan region of Pakistan. After seven months in captivity, Rohde and Ludin managed to escape during the night on June 19, 2009, an effort which Rohde later called in a byline for The Week as "last ditch" and "foolhardy", despite its success. According to Ludin, they snuck past Taliban guards after tiring out the men with repeated games of checkers. When the guards had fallen asleep, according to Rohde, they left separately under the guise of using the bathroom. The men escaped by climbing over the ten-foot wall of the compound where they were being held. Using a length of old rope Rohde had acquired two weeks prior they lowered themselves out of a window. The rope was several feet short of the ground, forcing the men to drop the last stage; Ludin injured his foot in the fall, though Rohde was unhurt. Mangal did not escape with the other two men. Rohde said that he and Ludin chose not to let Mangal in on the escape plans on fears that Mangal would tell the guards. He and Ludin feared that Mangal was cooperating with the Taliban. As it turns out, Mangal was cooperating only to ensure his own safety. He escaped on July 27, 2009.

The escapees made contact with a scout from the Pakistan Army, narrowly escaping being fatally mistaken for Taliban fighters, and were taken to a Frontier Corps post, from where they were flown to Bagram Air Base in Afghanistan. Rohde was reported to have been flown to Dubai to be reunited with his family. According to Rohde's family, "no ransom money was paid and no Taliban or other prisoners were released." They issued a statement declaring that it was "hard to describe the enormous relief we felt at hearing the news of David and Tahir's escape and knowing he is safe. Every day, during these past seven months, we have hoped and prayed for this moment."

== Media blackout ==
Rohde's kidnapping was kept quiet by much of the world's media following a request from The New York Times not to publicize the abduction. At least 40 news agencies were reported to know about the kidnapping, but observed the media blackout. A few outlets did briefly report the news. It was first reported by Pajhwok Afghan News in November 2008, citing two Afghan officials on the day after the abduction. Al Jazeera and the Italian news agency Adnkronos initially reported the kidnapping, as did the right-wing blogs Little Green Footballs, The Jawa Report and Dan Cleary, Political Insomniac. In March 2009 Michael Yon wrote about it as "it was pretty much out there" according to him. Other bloggers and agencies were contacted by the Times and agreed to take their pieces down. Yon kept information subsequent to his initial report quiet "upon request from related parties" and "archived" the paragraph. Greg Mitchell, the editor of Editor & Publisher, described it as "the most amazing press blackout on a major event that I have ever seen." The Times' executive editor, Bill Keller, stated: "From the early days of this ordeal, the prevailing view among David's family, experts in kidnapping cases, officials of several government and others we consulted was that going public could increase the danger. We decided to respect that advice ... and a number of other news organizations that learned of David's plight have done the same. We are enormously grateful for their support."

Dan Murphy of the Christian Science Monitor noted that "the way the Times handled Rohde's case reflects the set of informal rules the press is developing to deal with new kinds of conflict, and the new kinds of reporting that they require." The kidnappings in 2008 of the CBC News reporter Mellissa Fung in Afghanistan and Jill Carroll of the Christian Science Monitor in Iraq in 2006 had been tackled in a similar way, with the media observing blackouts in those cases as well (though they were shorter-lived, and in Carroll's case, major news outlets said they could not continue to sit on the story). Murphy nonetheless observed that the question of "whether the press is guilty of a double standard – protecting its own while reporting on other kidnapping cases" was likely to become "the subject of extended debate." Bob Steele, a media ethicist at the Poynter Institute, comments:

News organizations are balancing competing obligations if a journalist is kidnapped or detained. The primary obligation to the public is to report accurately and timely on meaningful events. If you have a journalist who is detained or kidnapped, that will generally reach the level of newsworthiness. News organizations also have an equal obligation to minimize harm. That means showing care and caution to not further endanger someone whose life may be in jeopardy. These are competing obligations and loyalties. There is also a matter of fairness and consistency. Would a news organization apply different standards in the case of a government diplomat or a business executive or a tourist than they would one of their own? ... You should not be bound by a rigid rule. Rather you make the best journalistic decision in each case. In almost all cases, the value of a human life outweighs the value of revealing facts in a kidnapping that you would usually report.

Bill Keller of the Times told The Washington Post that "there was a pretty firm consensus" among those whom he had consulted "that you really amp up the danger when you go public ... It makes us cringe to sit on a news story," but when a person's life was at stake, "the freedom to publish includes the freedom not to publish."

After David Rohde escaped, some people involved, including David himself, indicated that the reason the Times imposed a media blackout was not for Rohde's safety, but to decrease his ransom. An anonymous source quoted by New York Magazine claims that experts involved in the kidnapping never believed that David's life was in danger.

=== Role of Wikipedia ===
Wikipedia also participated in the media blackout. Prior to any references to the kidnapping being added to Rohde's article in Wikipedia, a Times reporter, Michael Moss, made changes to the article to emphasize the work that Rohde had done, in such a way that Rohde would be seen by his captors as being sympathetic to Muslims. Subsequently, reports of the kidnapping, which began on the following day, were removed by Michael Moss and some Wikipedia administrators. The Times also approached Wikipedia's co-founder Jimmy Wales for assistance in enforcing the media blackout. Wales turned to "trusted" Wikipedia administrators to repeatedly edit the article to remove all references to the kidnapping, and prevent already published information from being further disseminated.

In response to criticism over the actions taken, Wales stated that no Wikipedia policies were broken, and that relevant processes were followed. Peter Sussman of the Society of Professional Journalists' ethics committee likened the description of Wales involvement to that of a newspaper editor, and cautioned that an editorial role in censorship requires a degree of disclosure.

One rationale cited by Wales, in complying with the Times' request, was that the media blackout of the story, among major western/English-language news services at least, was relatively effective: "We were really helped by the fact that it hadn't appeared in a place we would regard as a reliable source. I would have had a really hard time with it if it had." He praised the assistance provided by Wikipedia editors: "I'm really proud of the Wikipedians who made this happen, maybe saved his life."
