= Garland Lodge and Resort =

Golf resort in Michigan, United States

Garland Lodge & Golf Resort

- Location within Michigan Location within the United States
- 44.8182°N 84.3106°W

Club information
- Location: Lewiston, Michigan
- Established: 1951
- Type: Resort
- Total holes: 72
- Website: www.garlandusa.com

Fountains
- Designed by: Ron Otto, Michael Benkusky (2010 redesign)
- Par: 72
- Length: 6,760 yards (6,180 m)
- Course rating: 73.1
- Slope rating: 140

Monarch
- Designed by: Ron Otto
- Par: 72
- Length: 7,166 yards (6,553 m)
- Course rating: 75
- Slope rating: 145

Reflections
- Designed by: Ron Otto
- Par: 72
- Length: 6,373 yards (5,827 m)
- Course rating: 71.1
- Slope rating: 135

Swampfire
- Designed by: Ron Otto
- Par: 72
- Length: 6,854 yards (6,267 m)
- Course rating: 74.3
- Slope rating: 143

Garland Lodge & Golf Resort (previously Garland Lodge & Resort, known informally as Garland) is a golf resort in Oscoda County, Michigan, located near the unincorporated community of Lewiston. The resort is named for businessman Harry G. Garland.

Garland consists of four 18-hole golf courses. In addition to the courses, Garland has a lodge, and many villas, cottages, condos, and other leisure facilities.

== History ==
Garland was established in 1951 by Herman Otto, a German-born American businessman. Otto developed land owned by Detroit-based Garland Manufacturing Company into a nine-hole golf course. The course was originally built for the enjoyment of family, friends, and employees of Garland Manufacturing. In the early 1960s, the course was opened to the public, with an additional nine holes added in 1973. Herman Otto died in 1983, at which point his widow Hildegard Otto assumed control of the resort.

The clubhouse was destroyed by a natural gas explosion and fire on Labor Day in 1985.

In 1986, Ron Otto purchased the resort from his mother, and succeeded her as the owner-operator of Garland. Following the fire, the Otto family made the decision to develop the property further, and began expansion of the lodge, which was reopened in 1987. The original 18 holes were integrated into other courses, which were designed and built beginning in the late 1980s.

Garland was acquired by New Frontiers Capital LLC in 2009. Following the change in ownership, the lobby, lounge, and dining room of the lodge received a full remodel. By 2011, New Frontiers had invested $7 million into the resort.

== Courses ==
Garland's four courses were designed by Ron Otto. Golf journalists have occasionally criticized Otto for designing his own courses, instead of hiring a professional architect. Each course was designed to be distinctive and offer its own unique technical challenges.

=== Fountains ===
Fountains was opened in 1995. In 2010, the course was redesigned by Illinois-based architect Michael Benkusky.

=== Monarch ===
Monarch was opened in 1990. The course was host to the Michigan PGA Championship from 1992 to 1994.

=== Reflections ===
Reflections was opened in 1990, and is the shortest of the four courses.

=== Swampfire ===
Swampfire was opened in 1987, and has water visible on 15 of 18 holes. The cart path at Swampfire features a bridge segment which spans over Oscoda County Road 489. The bridge was built by Andy Poineau of East Jordan, Michigan, and it is claimed to be the longest single-span log bridge in the world.

== Scorecards ==
Fountains
Tee	Rating/Slope	1	2	3	4	5	6	7	8	9	Out	10	11	12	13	14	15	16	17	18	In	Total
Par		4	4	3	4	4	5	4	3	5	36	4	3	4	5	4	4	3	4	5	36	72
Black	73.1 / 140	391	539	176	419	196	392	580	526	186	3405	513	184	532	419	412	485	180	456	196	3377	6782
Blue	71.6 / 137	369	529	167	405	157	383	536	514	150	3210	495	178	514	414	374	469	161	435	181	3221	6431
White	M: 69.3/128 L: 74.7/137	342	465	143	373	130	338	511	470	112	2884	455	154	495	390	344	453	142	411	144	2988	5872
Gold	M: 66.8/123 L: 71.7/129	307	455	133	303	126	331	471	465	103	2694	440	144	447	316	295	389	142	377	138	2688	5382
Red	M: 63.4/117 L: 67.6/122	269	388	70	298	103	302	430	420	82	2362	351	101	372	314	285	316	98	330	88	2255	4617
SI	Men's	6	4	12	2	16	14	10	8	18		15	7	17	5	3	11	9	1	13
SI	Ladies'	11	5	13	3	15	9	7	1	17		4	16	12	8	2	10	18	6	14

Monarch
Tee	Rating/Slope	1	2	3	4	5	6	7	8	9	Out	10	11	12	13	14	15	16	17	18	In	Total
Par		4	4	3	4	5	3	4	5	4	36	5	4	3	4	5	3	4	4	4	36	72
Black	75.0 / 145	451	413	209	429	515	160	447	549	393	3566	581	451	200	435	518	152	438	422	440	3637	7203
Blue	73.1 / 140	427	383	188	352	472	143	419	520	352	3256	551	428	179	407	492	124	410	399	425	3415	6671
White	M: 71.1/134 L: 76.6/140	412	374	182	343	457	129	395	505	342	3139	461	413	162	382	441	112	386	378	410	3145	6284
Gold	M: 68.0/118 L: 72.8/131	360	289	168	341	399	125	331	495	335	2843	450	337	144	276	431	111	380	281	356	2766	5609
Red	M: 64.5/106 L: 69.0/121	314	289	166	252	345	90	327	403	241	2427	399	260	135	270	393	96	323	281	320	2477	4904
SI	Men's	1	3	11	17	9	13	5	15	7		12	4	14	2	16	18	10	6	8
SI	Ladies'	1	9	11	17	5	15	3	7	13		14	8	18	4	6	16	2	12	10

Reflections
Tee	Rating/Slope	1	2	3	4	5	6	7	8	9	Out	10	11	12	13	14	15	16	17	18	In	Total
Par		4	5	4	3	5	3	4	5	3	36	5	3	5	4	4	5	3	4	3	36	72
Blue	71.1 / 135	383	487	342	173	555	150	381	497	170	3138	525	183	515	360	343	530	175	382	222	3235	6373
White	M: 69.1/130 L: 75.4/134	365	468	328	143	520	123	346	473	145	2911	501	162	498	348	326	500	158	336	195	3024	5935
Gold	M: 66.9/123 L: 72.0/127	310	377	318	133	426	113	337	463	135	2612	473	160	447	301	316	445	150	326	190	2808	5420
Red	M: 63.9/115 L: 67.9/120	307	377	247	113	426	95	236	403	87	2318	390	86	401	251	277	395	107	311	177	2395	4713
SI	Men's	3	5	7	11	1	15	9	17	13		10	12	6	2	16	8	18	14	4
SI	Ladies'	3	5	11	17	1	13	9	7	15		8	12	4	14	10	6	18	2	16

Swampfire
Tee	Rating/Slope	1	2	3	4	5	6	7	8	9	Out	10	11	12	13	14	15	16	17	18	In	Total
Par		4	5	3	4	3	5	4	5	3	36	5	3	4	4	5	4	4	3	4	36	72
Black	74.3 / 143	406	553	160	439	174	544	409	503	199	3387	532	196	443	406	527	383	380	185	442	3494	6881
Blue	72.0 / 138	382	523	136	414	151	521	386	485	182	3180	494	173	420	365	482	357	359	167	425	3242	6422
White	M: 70.3/133 L: 76.5/143	366	506	126	403	120	509	370	475	152	3027	487	165	411	352	469	344	346	150	395	3119	6146
Gold	M: 68.4/122 L: 73.7/137	307	443	120	315	115	502	360	468	150	2770	444	123	348	345	460	336	292	147	352	2847	5617
Red	M: 64.0/111 L: 68.4/123	263	383	68	309	100	415	269	398	125	2330	413	103	348	265	367	236	225	139	250	2346	4676
SI	Men's	7	3	15	1	13	9	5	17	11		10	16	2	6	14	4	8	18	12
SI	Ladies'	13	9	17	1	11	7	15	3	5		4	14	6	12	2	18	8	16	10
