= Juma Khan =

Afghani drug lord

Juma Khan جمعه خان
- Born: Nimruz Province, Afghanistan
- Arrested: USA; DEA
- Citizenship: Afghanistan
- Charge(s): Charges, if any, were never made public
- Status: Khan disappeared, once in US custody

Juma Khan is an ethnic Baloch drug lord from Afghanistan's southern Nimruz Province.

Juma Khan was an illiterate provincial Baloch drug smuggler from Nimruz Province in southwestern Afghanistan in the 1990s. He suddenly rose to national prominence after the American-led invasion of Afghanistan. He was briefly detained by American forces after the 2001 fall of the Taliban and released, even though American officials knew that he was involved in narcotics trafficking. After being released, he inexplicably seized control of the town of Bahramcha in the Chagai Hills on the Pakistan-Iran-Afghanistan border in late 2001 and turned it into a hub of drug smuggling and gun running into Pakistan and Iran.

His organization was designated as a Narcotics Kingpin under the SDN by the United States Department of the Treasury's Office of Foreign Assets Control, with addresses in Pakistan and Afghanistan.

In 2008, he was detained for unknown reasons in Indonesia and transported to New York. He was quietly released on April 20, 2018, without any pending charges or a trial. No official explanation was provided.

== See also ==
- Bashir Noorzai
