= Media blackout =

Censorship of news related to a certain topic

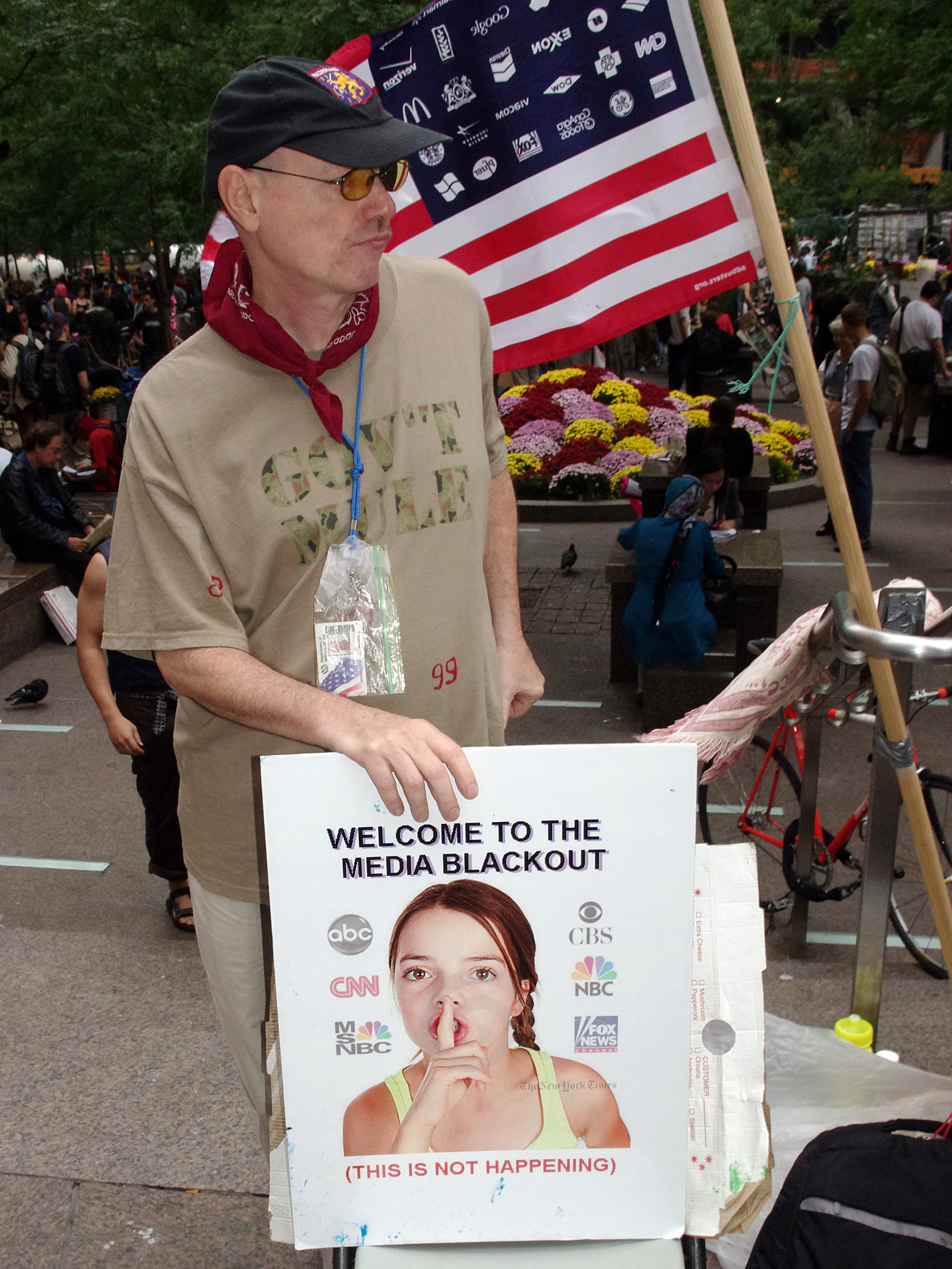
Protester holds sign accusing mainstream media outlets of engaging in a media blackout regarding the Occupy Wall Street protests.

A media blackout is the censorship or restriction of news related to a certain topic, particularly in mass media, by authorities, organizations or the media itself. A media blackout may be self-imposed, legally enforced by courts, governments or states, or implemented through technical measures that block or degrade electronic communication.

In countries with strong freedom of speech laws and traditions, media blackouts enforced by a government or military are generally rare and highly controversial, especially in peacetime. In those countries, there is sometimes support for media blackouts during armed conflict, but that support is generally limited and voluntary, rather than mandated by force. In the United Kingdom, sensitive national security information is managed through the Defense and Security Media Advisory (DSMA) notice system, established during World War II and still in operation. This Committee can request media blackouts on certain topics on voluntary basis. In many cases, some media outlets complied while others did not, as it was non-binding.

In countries with centralized, authoritarian governments, media blackouts are commonplace, often enshrined by law, directive, or decree or by the implied threat of harm should media criticize the government. For example, media in the Soviet Union mostly cooperated voluntarily with government media blackouts on a wide variety of issues. However, media less sympathetic to the government were discouraged from violating the blackouts out of fear of arrest, prosecution, or execution.

Media blackout should not be confused with related but distinct concepts, such as prior restraint, which refers to a specifically government-enforced prohibition on publication before it occurs, or gag orders, which are binding judicial or executive orders restricting disclosure.

== By governments ==
Richard Nixon describing an intended press blackout for the New York Times in 1971

Some examples of media blackout include the media bans of southern Japan during the droppings of the atomic bombs on Hiroshima and Nagasaki, and the lack of independent media correspondence from Iraq during the Persian Gulf War.

=== United States ===
==== During World War II ====
During World War II, the US Office of Censorship sent messages to newspapers and radio stations, which were acted on by recipients, asking them not to report any sightings or explosions of fire balloons, so the Japanese would have no information on the balloons' effectiveness when planning future actions. As a result, the Japanese learned the fate of only one of their bombs, which landed in Wyoming, but failed to explode. The Japanese stopped all launches after less than six months. The press blackout in the U.S. was lifted after the first deaths from fire balloons, to ensure that the public was warned, though public knowledge of the threat could have possibly prevented the deaths. News of the loss of over 4,000 lives when UK ship RMS Lancastria was sunk during the war was voluntarily suppressed to prevent it affecting civilian morale, but was published after it became known overseas.

==== Under Donald Trump ====
During the presidency of Donald Trump of the United States, multiple reports emerged of media blackouts and restrictions on press access within federal agencies. In January 2017, staff from the Environmental Protection Agency (EPA) was reported by Associated Press to be banned from releasing press statements, blog updates or posting on official social-media accounts. According to The Washington Post and Reuters, these measures were part of a broader effort by the administration to centralize messaging and control public information flow during its early months. These actions were criticized by the Committee to Protect Journalists and Reporters Without Borders as undermining transparency and public accountability.

=== Japan ===
==== By Western Allies ====
Japan has gone through massive media blackouts and information control by Western allies. After the Japanese surrender to Allied Forces, the Supreme Commander for the Allied Powers had control over Japanese media for about seven years, under the formation of the Civil Censorship Detachment. The CCD eventually banned a total of 31 topics from all forms of media.

==== Japanese Imperial Government ====
During World War II, the Japanese Imperial government had many media blackout laws, one of which being Article 27 of the "Newspaper Law" requiring authorization to publish war-related content whatsoever.

=== Middle East ===
During the Arab Spring, on January 27, 2011, the Egyptian government ordered a complete shutdown of the Internet amid nationwide protests demanding the resignation of then-President Hosni Mubarak. The blackout followed reports of blocked access to social media platforms like Twitter. This was an attempt to control the flow of information and suppress coordination among protestors. Despite these efforts, the protests intensified, ultimately leading to Mubarak's resignation on February 11, 2011.

A related series of events occurred shortly after the 2011 Egyptian media blackout in nearby Libya under the regime of Muammar Gaddafi. In a similar effort to control growing public protests, the government ordered the shutdown of YouTube on February 17, 2011. The following day, it ordered a curfew on internet access, shutting down the internet nationally during the nighttime hours.

Since the Arab Spring, there has been a marked increase in achieving media blackouts by blocking internet access as the 2020s saw a significant shift away from traditional media to internet-based streaming and social media platforms. In fact, in some parts of the world, these sorts of blackouts are now seen as commonplace.

=== Europe ===
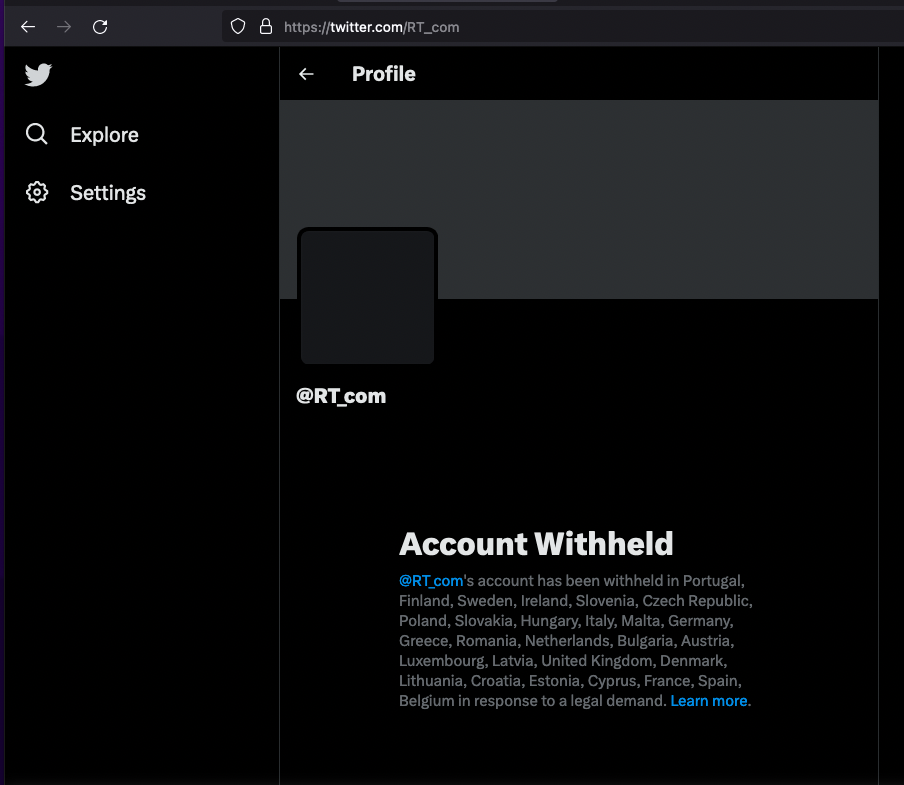
Russian Media Twitter account withheld in EU

As part of sanctions of the Russian invasion of Ukraine in 2022, the Russian publicly owned global medias RT and Russian government-owned media Sputnik have been banned from broadcasting and distribution within the European Union. Posts on the media's Twitter account are also no longer viewable.

Digital Services Act: Using concepts such as "countering disinformation" and "responding to crisis situations," there is concern that the European Commission will be able to invoke its "strong powers" to tighten regulations on social networking sites, search engines, etc. In the EU, Russian media outlets were restricted from reporting in the EU on the occasion of Russia's invasion of Ukraine.

== By individuals or groups ==
=== By labor organizations and businesses ===
In labor disputes, management and unions sometimes agree on a media blackout to facilitate negotiations without external pressure. A media blackout was used during the 2005 New York City transit strike to allow for more effective contract negotiation between the two sides of the dispute. The same measure was imposed by the federal mediator on the negotiations between American Airlines and the Association of Professional Flight Attendants in 2010. This has also been the case on several occasions in the media and entertainment industry.

Businesses may also invoke voluntary temporary blackouts during sensitive corporate events, such as mergers and acquisitions, to avoid market disruption. In these situations, companies typically maintain strict non-disclosure agreements and impose internal "blackout periods" until an agreement is announced.

=== By news media ===
In Nassau County, New York, on 4 July 1956, a 32-day-old baby named Peter Weinberger was kidnapped and held for $2,000 ransom; the kidnapper promised to return Weinberger "safe and happy" if his demand was met. Police arranged for the kidnapper to retrieve the money at a corner near Weinberger's home and requested a media blackout to reduce the risk of the kidnapper harming Peter before the exchange. The New York Daily News reported on the kidnapping anyway, drawing heavy press attention to Weinberger's house and scaring the kidnapper out of retrieving the ransom money. The kidnapper then abandoned Weinberger in some heavy brush off a highway exit. Weinberger was found dead a month later, having died of infant exposure.

The 2008 abduction of Canadian journalist Mellissa Fung was given a media blackout to assure her safe return. All media sources obliged making the Canadian public unaware of the fate of Fung.

In 2008, the fact that Prince Harry, then third in line to the British throne, was serving on active duty in Afghanistan was subject to a blackout in the British media for his own safety. He was brought home early after the blackout was broken by foreign media.

In 2009, New York Times journalist David Rohde was released from captivity after having been kidnapped by the Taliban in Afghanistan for seven months. Many were surprised to hear about his return, as they had not heard about his kidnapping. The New York Times solicited voluntary cooperation from the larger media industry to keep the kidnapping low-profile, both to increase Rohde's chances of survival but also to deescalate tensions that often come with hostage-taking.

==== Bernie Sanders' 2016 primary campaign ====
During the lead-up to the 2016 U.S. presidential election, Senator Bernie Sanders was perceived by some observers to received less mainstream media coverage than his competitors, especially Hillary Clinton and Donald Trump, a situation sometimes described as a "media blackout". Analysts attributed the disparity in coverage to Sanders' lower initial name recognition, and his reluctance to engage the media’s “contest of personalities” (Tyndall, 2017). While the documentary Bernie Blackout (2012) supported a case of media blackout, this notion was rejected in 2016 by journalist Clare Malone, saying he "received 30 percent of coverage in the Democratic primary at that time”.

=== By sports associations ===
In association football, a press or media blackout is also referred to as a silenzio stampa (literally press silence) from the corresponding Italian phrase. It describes situations in which a football club or national team (including its players and coaching staff) refuse to give interviews or in any other way cooperate with the press, often during important tournaments, or when the club feels that the media does not depict the club and their activities in a fair and objective way. One of the early examples of silenzio stampa happened during the 1982 FIFA World Cup, when the Italian team created a news blackout due to rumors and untrue stories circulating in the press.

== Methods for media blackout ==
=== Legal and regulatory methods ===
- Gag orders (or suppression orders)
- Prior restraint
- Licensing of media outlets
- Censorship laws and decrees For further information: Freedman v. Maryland

=== Technology and communication infrastructure ===
- Internet shutdown or “kill switches”
- Platform blocks
- DNS or IP blocking
- Content filtering

=== Physical and direct methods ===
- Removal of content
- Refusing to engage with journalists
- Intimidation or detention of journalists

== Legal framework ==
In most jurisdictions, media blackout is not treated as a separate legal category but evaluated as a form of censorship or prior restraint.

At the international level, media blackout is covered as part of the “freedom of expression” section of several treaties. Article 19 of the International Covenant on Civil and Political Rights (1966) states that :

2. Everyone shall have the right to freedom of expression; this right shall include "freedom to seek, receive and impart information and ideas of all kinds", regardless of frontiers, either orally, in writing or in print, in the form of art, or through any other media of his choice.

This is reaffirmed in the European Convention on Human Rights (Article 10, 1953) that states that everyone has the right to “seek, receive, and impart information”.

The ICCPR formulates conditions under which restrictions may be imposed, reaffirmed in article 10-2 of the ECHR :

1. The restrictions must be provided by law.
2. They must be necessary, either for “respect of the rights or reputations of other” or “for the protection of national security or of public order (ordre public), or of public health or morals”.

At the domestic level, media blackout are usually regulated through national constitutions, statutory law or emergency legislation, that balance freedom of the press with national security and public order. Courts and oversight bodies then review whether media blackout measures respect constitutional rights or international obligations. In European states, such restrictions to freedom of expression, including media access, are subjects to the ECHR, meaning courts apply proportionality tests to ensure that measures remain strictly necessary.

== See also ==
- DSMA-Notice
- Freedom of the press
- Gag order
- Prior restraint
- Protest paradigm
- Internet censorship
- Internet outage
- News embargo
