= Lowell Birrell =

Stock manipulators

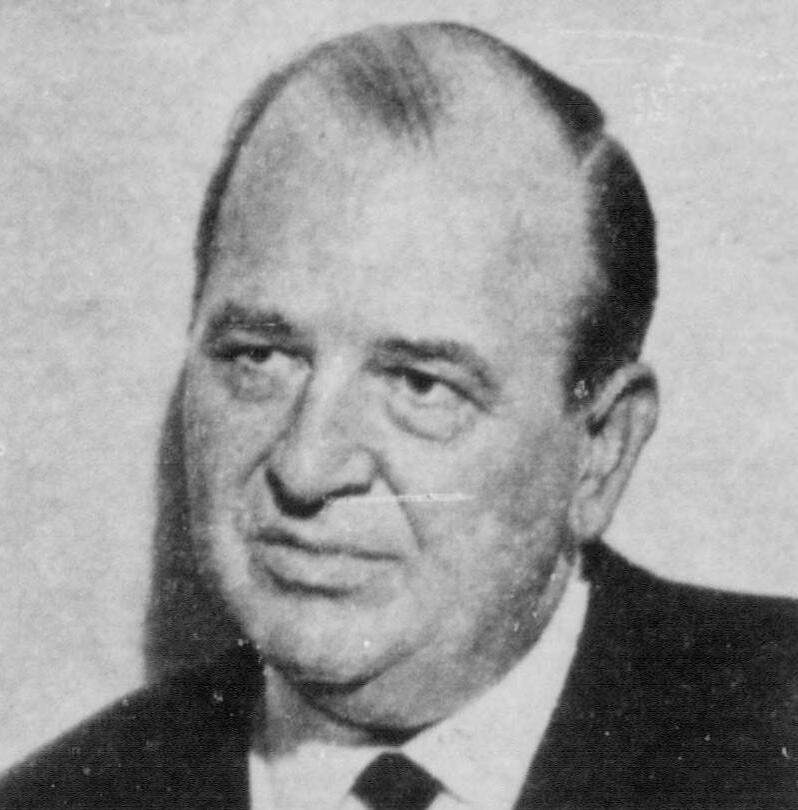
Lowell Birrell

Lowell McAfee Birrell (February 5, 1907 – March 15, 1993) was one of the biggest stock manipulators in the 1950s. He fled the United States to Brazil, but eventually returned and served time in prison for securities fraud.

== Biography ==
Birrell was born in Whiteland, Indiana, the son of a Presbyterian minister. He graduated from the University of Michigan Law School in 1928, and briefly practiced law at the law firm of Cadwalader, Wickersham & Taft.

Through a series of complex transactions involving mergers and stock issuances Birrell gained control of 40 companies, including Claude Neon, United Dye & Chemical Corp., Fidelio Breweries, Swan-Finch Oil Co., Rhode Island Insurance, Equitable Plan, American Leduc Company, and Doeskin Products, Inc. According to the government, he left ten companies in bankruptcy or insolvency. He looted United Dye & Chemical for $2 million, before selling it to Alexander Guterma, another stock manipulator.

In October 1957, Birrell fled to Cuba and then to Brazil with $3 million in cash. He was indicted in July 1959 by a New York County grand jury on charges of stealing stock valued at $14 million from two companies he controlled (Swan-Finch Oil and Doeskin Products). He was also indicted by a federal grand jury for stock fraud in July 1961. Birrell returned to the United States in April 1964 as he was reportedly short of money. (In addition, an extradition treaty with Brazil was scheduled to go into effect in December 1964, as Brazil had become a haven for a number of stock swindlers from the United States, like Ben Jack Cage, Earl Belle and Edward M. Gilbert.) Birrell was jailed for 15 months until friends raised the bail of $40,000. He was found guilty in December 1967 of 11 counts of securities fraud involving rigging the stock of American Leduc Petroleums, Ltd. The judge died before he could impose a sentence, but Birrell spent 23 months in prison before he could raise bail. He was then indicted in July 1969 for conspiracy and fraud involving using a blank stock certificate to obtain a bank loan, and then convicted in July 1970 and sentenced to two more years. He was called "the most brilliant manipulator of corporations in modern times" by the Securities and Exchange Commission. Attorney Arthur L. Liman, who helped prosecute Birrell, called him the "most notorious stock swindler in the 1950s" and "perhaps the leading wrecker of corporations and deluder of investors in the postwar era."
