= David Rohde =

American author and investigative journalist

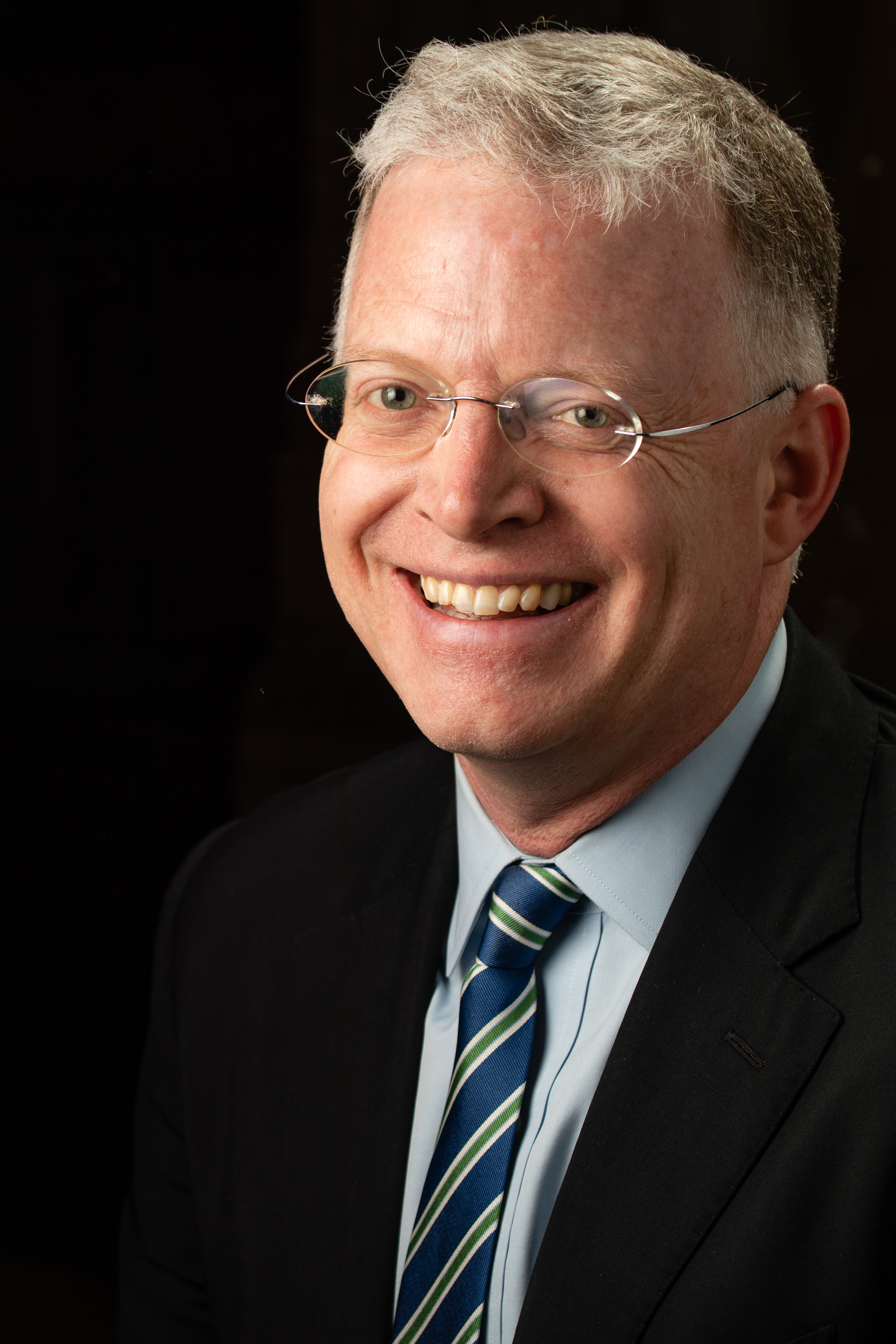
- Rohde at the 2018 Pulitzer Prizes
- Born: David Stephenson Rohde; August 7, 1967 (age 59); Maine, U.S.
- Education: Brown University (BA, 1990)
- Occupation: Investigative journalist
- Notable credit(s): 1996 Pulitzer Prize winner 2010 Michael Kelly Award winner
- Spouse: Kristen Mulvihill

David Stephenson Rohde (born August 7, 1967) is an American author and investigative journalist. He is the former online news director for The New Yorker and now the senior executive editor on national security for NBC News. While a reporter for The Christian Science Monitor, he won the Pulitzer Prize for International Reporting in 1996 for his coverage of the Srebrenica massacre. From 2002 to 2005, he was co-chief of The New York Times's South Asia bureau, based in New Delhi. He later contributed to the newspaper's team coverage of Afghanistan and Pakistan that received the 2009 Pulitzer Prize for International Reporting and was a finalist in his own right in the category in 2010. He was a global affairs analyst for CNN. and held the position of Senior Executive Editor of National Security and Law before joining MS NOW (formerly MSNBC) on October 20, 2025 as Senior National Security Reporter.

During the Bosnian War in 1995, Rohde was arrested by Bosnian Serb authorities after his reporting on the Srebrenica massacre, a genocidal killing of thousands of Bosniak men and boys. He was held for ten days until intense diplomatic pressure by the US government secured his release.

While in Afghanistan, Rohde was kidnapped by members of the Taliban in November 2008 but escaped in June 2009. While he was in captivity, The New York Times collaborated with a number of media outlets, including Al-Jazeera and Wikipedia, to remove news of the kidnapping from the public eye. This was done to decrease his value as a hostage and bargaining chip and thereby increase his chance of survival.

== Background ==
Rohde is a native of Maine. He is a graduate of Fryeburg Academy, a boarding school in Fryeburg, Maine. He attended Bates College before transferring to Brown University, where he received a BA in history in 1990.

Two months before his kidnapping, he married Kristen Mulvihill, a fashion and photography editor, painter, illustrator, and co-author with her husband of A Rope and a Prayer: A Kidnapping from Two Sides. Mulvihill was formerly a picture editor for Cosmopolitan magazine.

=== Reporting ===
Rohde worked as a production secretary for the ABC News World News Tonight program from June 1990 to August 1991, and as a production associate for ABC's New Turning Point from January to July 1993. He has also worked as a freelance reporter based in the Baltic republics, Cuba, and Syria. He served as a county and municipal reporter for The Philadelphia Inquirer from July 1993 to June 1994 before joining The Christian Science Monitor. He initially covered national news, reporting from Boston, New York City, and Washington, DC. In November 1994, he was sent to Zagreb, Croatia, to work as the newspaper's Eastern European correspondent. There, he helped expose the ethnic cleansing and genocide of the Muslim population of eastern Bosnia. He joined The New York Times in April 1996 and worked there through mid-2011. He reported from Afghanistan for the first three months of the US-led war against the Taliban and served as co-chief of the Times's South Asia bureau from 2002 to 2005. He was a member of the paper's investigations department in New York City from 2005 to 2011. Before joining The New Yorker in May 2017, he worked for Reuters in a variety of capacities, including foreign affairs columnist (2011–2013), investigative reporter (2014–2015), and national security investigations editor (2015–2017).

Rohde's Times colleagues have called him "an intrepid yet unassuming reporter who conducts himself modestly around the office, predictably attired in neatly ironed Oxford shirts and, often, his weathered Boston Red Sox cap".

==== Srebrenica ====
Rohde was the first outside eyewitness of the aftermath of the Srebrenica massacre when he traveled to the eastern Bosnian town of Srebrenica and Zepa in August 1995, a month after the towns fell to the Army of the Republika Srpska. He reported seeing human bones, "Muslim prayer beads, clothing and still legible receipts and election ballots from Srebrenica", as well as shell casings and ammunition boxes in the vicinity of three mass graves. He described being told that Bosnian Serb troops were hunting down and summarily executing Bosnian Muslims (Bosniaks) from the town. He subsequently found eyewitnesses to the massacre and wrote about the circumstances that led to the killings.

He returned to the Republika Srpska in October 1995 to follow up his article on the Srebrenica massacre, but was secretly arrested by Bosnian Serb authorities on October 29 in the town of Zvornik, around 80 miles from Sarajevo. He was charged with "illegal border crossing and staying on the territory of the Republika Srpska and for falsifying documents". He was held captive in the Bosnian Serb-held town of Bijeljina for ten days, during which he was repeatedly interrogated, harassed, and kept in a 10 ft × 20 ft (3 m × 6 m) cell with five other inmates for over 23 hours a day. Rohde was sentenced to 15 days' imprisonment on the first two charges and was due to be sentenced on the spying charge before he was released. The trial had been held in Serbo-Croatian and, although a translator was present, there was no defense lawyer and no US diplomatic representation, as required by the Vienna Convention. The espionage charge, the most serious of the three, was "punishable by three to 15 years [imprisonment] in peacetime and 10 years to death in wartime".

Rohde's capture was not initially admitted by the Bosnian Serb authorities, who gave conflicting answers as to whether he had been detained and where he was being held. Five days after he was taken prisoner, the Bosnian Serb news agency issued a statement on his capture. The US government then applied intense diplomatic pressure to release him. A key role was played by Kati Marton, an author and journalist married to the US envoy Richard Holbrooke, who was negotiating with Serbian president Slobodan Milošević to end the Bosnian War. Marton, at the time the chair of the Committee to Protect Journalists, intervened repeatedly during the talks that led to the Dayton Agreement to persuade Milošević to use his influence to secure Rohde's release. US Secretary of State Warren Christopher was also involved in pressing for Rohde's release at the Dayton talks. Many other political and journalistic figures also campaigned on Rohde's behalf, including Senator Bob Dole, Peter Jennings, Ted Koppel, Samantha Power, and David Frost. Rohde was subsequently pardoned by order of the Bosnian Serb leader, Radovan Karadžić, in what he characterized as a goodwill gesture.

After his release, Rohde reported that he had reached Srebrenica and found substantial evidence of the massacre at four of six of the mass grave sites previously identified by US reconnaissance aircraft and satellites, and said: "A final, accurate accounting of the Srebrenica massacres will only come if Sahanici and the other five sites are dredged for the truth." He described the circumstances of his arrest:

This correspondent changed the date of issue on a Bosnian Serb press accreditation from 19/12/94 to 29/10/95 and used it to pass through Bosnian Serb checkpoints and reach the area. This correspondent was arrested at the execution site by Bosnian Serb police, stripped of all documents and photos taken of the area, accused of espionage, and jailed for 10 days.

His ordeal in captivity and the subsequent negotiations to free him were described in detail in a three-part special report published a few days later.

Rohde's reporting from Bosnia, according to the British journalist Henry Porter:

had a deep effect on the journalists who had covered the Bosnian civil war. They became not so much militarised as passionately committed to fighting Milosevic's regime .... [I]f Rohde had not – at some personal risk – set out to prove the rumours about the massacres, a great truth would have been buried along with the thousands of men from Srebrenica.

Porter added, "the extent of the slaughter might not have emerged if it had not been for the bravery of David Rohde".

In December 1995, Rohde testified before the US House of Representatives Committee on Security and Cooperation in Europe about what he had seen at Srebrenica. In April 1996, he returned to Srebrenica with a group of Western reporters and found that "approximately 70 percent of the larger of the two mass graves and approximately 50 percent of the smaller of the two have been recently dug up" and that other evidence he had seen in 1995 had been removed.

Also in April 1996, Rohde won the Polk Award for foreign reporting, cited for "risking his life to uncover the Srebrenica massacres of Bosnian Muslims, the worst genocide in Europe since the Holocaust". Shortly afterward, he was awarded the 1996 Pulitzer Prize "for his persistent on-site reporting of the massacre of thousands of Bosnian Muslims in Srebrenica".

In 1997, Rohde published a widely acclaimed account of the massacre, Endgame: The Betrayal and Fall of Srebrenica – Europe's Worst Massacre Since World War II (published in paperback as A Safe Area: Srebrenica – Europe's Worst Massacre Since the Second World War). It was described as a "masterly" account of how "good—but conflicted and weakly held—Western intentions were swept away by the racist imperatives of the Serb leaders". In The Guardian, Julian Borger called it "essential reading", writing: "It is journalism at its committed best—painstaking, compassionate, full of telling detail and rigorous in its judgments."

Rohde's work was the subject of study by a class in "Elements of International Reporting" at the Columbia University Graduate School of Journalism in 2001. The study explained: "We felt that Rohde's work was ideal for a case study in reporting on gross human rights violations, presenting opportunities to study both the professional techniques and the moral issues that pertain to such work."

==== Detainees ====
At The New York Times, Rohde has written about the wars in Afghanistan and Iraq. He has reported on, among other things, the hardships endured by men detained and released from the US military detention center at Guantanamo Bay, Cuba. During 2004 and 2005, he wrote extensively on the treatment of detainees at the Abu Ghraib prison in Baghdad and the Bagram Air Base in Afghanistan. He also broke the story of the full extent of the US government's roundup of American Muslims after the September 11 attacks. The American Prospect wrote:

Because of pervasive secrecy, little was known about how the detainees were treated until The New York Times published a story by David Rohde on January 20, 2003. It was datelined Karachi, Pakistan. Rohde had interviewed six Pakistani men deported from the United States after being detained in John Ashcroft's sweep.

In April 2009, Rohde shared a second Pulitzer Prize, awarded to the staff of The New York Times for "its masterful, groundbreaking coverage of America's deepening military and political challenges in Afghanistan and Pakistan, reporting frequently done under perilous conditions".

== Kidnapping ==
In November 2008, while in Afghanistan doing research for a book, Rohde and two associates were kidnapped by members of the Taliban. After being held captive for seven months and ten days, in June 2009 Rohde and one of his associates escaped to safety. The other associate escaped a month later. During his captivity, Rohde's colleagues at The New York Times appealed to other members of the news media not to publish anything about the abduction. The resulting media blackout of Rohde's kidnapping caused a wider debate about the responsibility to report news in a timely manner. Wikipedia co-founder Jimmy Wales complied with a request from the Times to maintain the blackout, which he did through several administrators.

== Recognition ==
In January 2012, Rohde was named one of the International Press Institute's World Press Freedom Heroes.

== Bibliography ==
- Rohde, David S. (1997). A Safe Area: Srebrenica – Europe's Worst Massacre Since the Holocaust. Simon & Schuster. ISBN 9780671004996. Paperback editions:
  - ⸺ (1997). Endgame: The Betrayal and Fall of Srebrenica – Europe's Worst Massacre Since World War II. Farrar, Straus and Giroux. ISBN 9780374253424. Reprinted under this title: 1998, Basic Books / Westview Press, ISBN 9780813335339; and 2012, Penguin Books, ISBN 978-0143120315
- ⸺; with Mulvihill, Kristen (2010). A Rope and a Prayer: A Kidnapping from Two Sides. Viking Press. ISBN 9780670022236.
- ⸺ (2020). In Deep: The FBI, the CIA, and the Truth about America's "Deep State". W. W. Norton & Co. ISBN 978-1-324-00354-0.
- ⸺ (2024). Where Tyranny Begins: The Justice Department, the FBI, and the War Against Democracy. W. W. Norton & Co. ISBN 978-0-393-88196-7.

== See also ==
- List of solved missing person cases (2000s)
- Mellissa Fung, another journalist in which the news about their kidnappings in Afghanistan around the same time were temporarily suppressed through a voluntary media blackout
