= Colin Rutherford =

Canadian who was held captive by the Taliban

- Born: December 21, 1983 (age 42)
- Occupation: Auditor
- Known for: Being kidnapped by the Taliban

Colin Mackenzie Rutherford is a Canadian who was held captive by the Taliban. In October 2010 Rutherford traveled to Afghanistan to pursue an interest in the country's ancient civilizations. Police informed his family he had been captured on November 4, 2010. The Taliban made a video of Rutherford public in May 2011.

== Release ==
Rutherford was freed on January 11, 2016—the fourteenth anniversary of the opening of Guantanamo Bay detention camps, in Cuba. Neither Stephane Dion, Canada's new Minister of Foreign Affair, or Rutherford's mother, Wendy, agreed to an interview on the day of Rutherford's release. But his brother Brian shared his happiness, via email. Dion's press release thanked the government of Qatar for their help.

In June 2015, retired Green Beret Lieutenant Colonel Jason Amerine testified before the United States Senate Armed Forces Committee about the American military's failure to free hostages in Afghanistan. Amerine told Congress he had prepared a rescue plan for Rutherford, and American Caitlin Coleman and her Canadian husband Joshua Boyle. The National Post reported that Amerine said his rescue plan was "scuttled by U.S. government infighting".

== Aftermath ==
Three days after his release Canadian Prime Minister Justin Trudeau confirmed that Rutherford hadn't yet returned to Canada. During his captivity experienced commentators had asserted that the Taliban had probably moved him to Pakistan's Tribal Areas, but the Taliban released in Ghazni province, and said that this is where he had been held.

Trudeau, like Dion, thanked Qatar for their assistance. Taliban spokesmen confirmed that Qatar had played a role.

The Taliban spokesmen said they had released Rutherford "on grounds of humanitarian sympathy and sublime Islamic ethics."

Yahoo News quoted comments from Christian Leuprecht, of Canada's Royal Military College and Queen's University. He suggested the Taliban had released Rutherford as a sign of good faith, in order to win a place at the peace talk table. He pointed out the brutal way Daesh executes prisoners, and asserted the Taliban wanted to remind those negotiating peace that they weren't brutal in the same way Daesh were.

"[The release of Rutherford] is a tacit way for the Afghan Taliban to signal that 'We're not just the bad guys anymore. We might have taken him hostage, but we didn't execute him, we didn't mistreat him.' It's a way of signalling to the world community that, look, 'Maybe you should be talking to us.'"

However, according to The New York Times, Rutherford was picked up by the FBI and United States Army Rangers after Qatar arranged a prisoner swap with the Afghan government.

== See also ==
- List of kidnappings
- List of solved missing person cases (post-2000)
