= Bashir Noorzai =

Afghan convicted former drug lord

- Other name: "Pablo Escobar of the Middle East"
- Occupation: Drug smuggler
- Known for: Helped the US negotiate with the Taliban

Bashir Noorzai is a former Afghan drug lord. He was an early supporter of the Taliban and later worked as an undercover agent on behalf of the U.S. government. Despite being among America's most wanted drug traffickers, he agreed to come to New York City for a debriefing after being promised by his handlers that he would not be arrested, and was arrested ten days after his arrival.

In 2008, he was convicted of smuggling heroin into the U.S. and sentenced to life imprisonment. After the Taliban regained control of Afghanistan, the 2022 US–Afghan prisoner exchange saw him released from prison in exchange for American contractor Mark Frerichs.

== Biography ==
He fought the Soviet forces that occupied Afghanistan from 1979 to 1989.

He was left in charge of Kandahar after Taliban founder Mullah Omar went into hiding. He provided explosives, weapons, and militia fighters to the Taliban regime, and was one of Omar's favorite warlords.

Noorzai was in Quetta when the September 11 attacks occurred, and soon afterwards returned to Afghanistan. In November 2001, he met with men he described as American military officials at Spinboldak, near the Afghan-Pakistani border. Small teams of U.S. Special Forces and intelligence officers were in Afghanistan at the time, seeking the support of tribal leaders. According to his lawyer, Noorzai was taken to Kandahar, where he was detained and questioned for six days by the Americans about Taliban officials and operations. He agreed to work with them and was freed, and in late January 2002 he handed over 15 truckloads of weapons, including about 400 anti-aircraft missiles, that had been hidden by the Taliban in his tribe's territory.

On June 1, 2004, he was sanctioned under the Foreign Narcotics Kingpin Designation Act.

=== Arrest ===
In April 2005, U.S. authorities in New York City arrested Noorzai. He was charged with trying to smuggle more than US$50 million worth of heroin into the United States. He is one of ten people and organizations on a U.S. list of most-wanted drug traffickers. RFE/RL looks at alleged ties between Afghanistan's former Taliban regime and the illegal narcotics trade in light of the Noorzai arrest. Noorzai was represented at his 2008 trial by New York high-profile criminal defense lawyer Ivan Fisher. The case has raised substantial questions about U.S. foreign policy abroad. In 2008 Noorzai was convicted of smuggling $50 million worth of heroin into the United States. On April 30, 2009, he appeared before Judge Denny Chin, who sentenced Noorzai to life imprisonment.

The New York Times reported that the leadership vacuum in the drug trade, following Noorzai's capture, was filled by Juma Khan. Khan was, in turn, captured in 2010.

The Afghanistan Times reported that Taliban officials said Noorzai had been released, in the United Arab Emirates, on July 16, 2019. They reported that he would join Taliban peace negotiators, in Qatar. They incorrectly reported he had been released from the Guantanamo detention camp. However, Noorzai was not released from prison.

In the aftermath of the takeover of the country by the Taliban, the group demanded that the US release him in exchange with an American engineer, Mark Frerichs, who was kidnapped by the group in January 2020. Noorzai was released and exchanged for Frerichs on September 19, 2022, at Kabul International Airport.
