= Kidnapping of Joshua Boyle and Caitlan Coleman =

Kidnapping in the Maidan Wardak Province of Afghanistan

In October 2012, Canadian-American couple Joshua Boyle and Caitlan Coleman were kidnapped in the Maidan Wardak Province of Afghanistan while on a trip through Central and South Asia. They were held by the Haqqani network until October 2017 when they were rescued by Pakistani forces in Kurram Agency, Pakistan. During their captivity, Coleman gave birth to three children.

== Background ==
Joshua Boyle was born in Breslau, Ontario, to Linda and Patrick J. Boyle. He attended Rockway Mennonite Collegiate in Kitchener, Ontario, and graduated from the University of Waterloo in 2005. Following the September 11 attacks, Boyle became interested in human rights issues and the case of Omar Khadr, a Canadian held in Guantanamo Bay. Boyle believed Khadr was innocent and spent several years acting as the spokesman for the Khadr family. Through his work with Khadr, Boyle met and eventually married Omar's sister Zaynab in 2009, but they divorced in 2010.

Caitlan Coleman grew up in Stewartstown, Pennsylvania.

Boyle and Coleman met online as teenagers as mutual fans of the Star Wars franchise and were married in 2011. After their marriage, they spent time travelling in Central America before moving to Perth-Andover, New Brunswick, where Boyle worked as a municipal clerk. In July 2012, the two began travelling through Russia and Central Asia, planning on travelling through the "safe '-stans". For unknown reasons, the couple crossed into Afghanistan in October; Boyle has stated it was to help "ordinary villagers", while other accounts indicate a more spontaneous decision.

== Kidnapping ==
On October 8, 2012, Boyle sent an email to Coleman’s parents saying that he and Coleman were in an "unsafe" part of Afghanistan. Soon after, the pair were captured by members of the Haqqani network. Coleman was pregnant at the time of their capture. The first ransom video of the couple was released in early 2013. The Haqqani network demanded the release of prisoners in exchange for the release of Boyle and Coleman. It was also revealed that Coleman had given birth to her child, a boy.

Over the course of their five-year captivity, Coleman gave birth to a girl and a second boy, and suffered a miscarriage of a second girl. Coleman and Boyle claim that the miscarriage was intentionally caused by their captors, but the Taliban claims it occurred naturally. The two would regularly be separated and beaten, and Coleman stated that she was raped. The family would regularly be transported between Afghanistan and Pakistan.

== Rescue ==
In June 2015, decorated Green Beret Lieutenant Colonel Jason Amerine testified before the United States Senate Armed Forces Committee about the American military's failure to free hostages in Afghanistan. Amerine told the U.S. Senate hearing that during his efforts, he obtained details about Canadian Colin Rutherford; U.S. citizen Coleman and her Canadian husband, and U.S. citizen Warren Weinstein. Amerine told Congress he had prepared a rescue plan for Rutherford, Coleman and Boyle. Amerine said his rescue plan was "scuttled by U.S. government infighting". Amerine told U.S. lawmakers “Warren Weinstein is dead, Colin Rutherford, Joshua Boyle, Caitlan Coleman and the child she bore in captivity are still hostages in Pakistan. I failed them. I exhausted all efforts and resources available to return them but I failed.”

In September 2017, United States intelligence received information that a vehicle which was believed to be carrying Caitlan Coleman and her children was traveling to Pakistan from Afghanistan. The information about the suspicious vehicle was passed to the Pakistani government with a request to oversee a rescue operation.

On October 11, 2017, Pakistani troops encountered the vehicle carrying the family in the Kurram Valley, Pakistan, shooting out the tires and rescuing them. The family was being held in the locked trunk. In the resulting shootout, some of the captors were killed while others managed to flee. Boyle was also injured by shrapnel. The family was then transported to Islamabad before travelling back to Canada via the United Kingdom. Boyle denied reporting that he refused to return to Canada with the American military.

After their rescue, the family stayed with Boyle's parents in Smiths Falls, Ontario, before moving to Ottawa. In December 2017, Canadian Prime Minister Justin Trudeau met with the family.

== See also ==
- List of kidnappings
- List of solved missing person cases (post-2000)
