= Alexander Guterma =

Stock manipulator in the US in the 1950's

Alexander Leonard Guterma (alias Sandy McSande) (April 29, 1915 – April 5, 1977) was one of the biggest stock manipulators in the United States in the 1950s, for which he was convicted and served three years in prison.

== Biography ==
Guterma's early years are not well documented. He claimed he was born in Irkutsk, Siberia, the son of a Russian czarist Army general and a Polish mother. The family fled Russia during the Russian Revolution to China, where he attended a missionary school. He was found by immigration officials in Honolulu, Hawaii, in 1935 and deported. He said that he escaped from a Japanese POW camp in the Philippines, although other reports said he ran a casino there during the war catering to Japanese Army soldiers. After World War II, he became the manager of several companies in the Philippines, where he married an American woman, Anita Louise McGrath. In 1950, he came to the United States to set up a kenaf fiber company in Florida.

Through extensive financial maneuvering, Guterma gained control of F.L. Jacobs Co. (an auto parts maker), Bon Ami Co. (a scouring powder manufacturer), Scranton Corporation (a holding company; formerly a lace manufacturer), Hal Roach Studios, Mutual Broadcasting System, Shawano Development Company (Florida land), Western Financial Corporation (a holding company), Micro-Moisture Controls (electronic devices), McGrath Securities (a brokerage firm), and United Hotels Corporation. Guterma also had dealings with Lowell Birrell, another stock manipulator, by buying United Dye & Chemical Corp. (renamed Chemoil) from him. At the time, he was the only person to head three separate NYSE-listed companies.

In 1959, the Securities and Exchange Commission charged Guterma with failure to file financial statements. He was arrested after he booked a seat on a plane to Ankara, Turkey. He was convicted and in February 1960 was sentenced to serve four years and 11 months in prison and fined $160,000 for violating federal securities regulations by looting F.L. Jacobs Company of $3.5 million. In 1959, Guterma had also been charged with failing to register as a foreign agent after taking $750,000 for the Mutual Broadcasting System to provide favorable coverage of Rafael Trujillo's Dominican Republic government. Guterma pleaded no contest and was sentenced to eight to 24 months in prison and fined $10,000. After prison, he became a real estate developer in Boca Raton, Florida. He also purchased a coal mine business, Mount Victory Coal Company in Somerset, Kentucky.

Guterma died on April 5, 1977, in a crash of a private aircraft near La Guardia Airport, along with his wife and four of his children. A son, Marc, survived the crash, but died in another airplane crash in 1985 on Delta Air Lines Flight 191 near Dallas/Fort Worth International Airport. Another son, Robert, was not on the plane. The aircraft was owned by Mount Victory Coal Company.
