= Mark Frerichs =

American civil engineer and captive

- Born: July 13, 1962 (age 63)
- Occupation: Civil engineer
- Known for: Kidnapped by the Haqqani network

Mark Randall Frerichs (born July 13, 1962) is an American civil engineer and former US Navy diver who disappeared in Afghanistan in January 2020 and was later confirmed to be captured by the Haqqani network, a group closely aligned with the Taliban. In September 2022, Frerichs was released by the Taliban-led government of the Islamic Emirate of Afghanistan in exchange for Bashir Noorzai.

== Biography ==
Frerichs is a director of International Logistical Support whose work had led him to visit Afghanistan multiple times since 2012. He served in the United States Navy as a diver.

Frerichs disappeared in Kabul, Afghanistan, on January 31, 2020. The Associated Press reported that US intelligence officials tracked Frerichs's cell phone and raided a village near where he disappeared, approximately a week after his disappearance. Although they rounded up individuals from that village, the raid proved unproductive. The next month, Newsweek magazine reported that officials had confirmed that Frerichs had been taken captive by the Haqqani network, a group closely aligned with the Taliban.

Frerichs's sister, Charlene Cakora, questioned why the US government "signed a peace deal" with the Taliban in early February 2020 that did not include a provision for releasing her brother. The Federal Bureau of Investigation, the lead agency of the Hostage Recovery Fusion Cell, issued a statement saying the cell was working to ensure "that Mark Frerichs and all Americans held hostage abroad are returned home."

On May 10, 2020, the FBI offered a $1-million reward for information that helps lead to Frerichs's release or rescue. In addition, the Rewards for Justice Program offered a $5-million reward for information leading to his location. That same day, Taliban spokesmen asserted that they had conducted an inquiry of their subordinate and associated groups and confirmed they were not holding Frerichs.

The New York Times reported Frerichs was still a captive on November 21, 2020, when Secretary of State Mike Pompeo traveled to Afghanistan to personally participate in peace negotiations with the Taliban. They reported it was unknown whether Pompeo raised Frerichs's captivity as an issue during the talks.

On April 1, 2022, a video was released showing Frerichs pleading for help. Following the release of Safi Rauf, an American aid worker who was held captive by the Taliban between December 2021 and April 2022, the US State Department began an attempted inquiry into the release of Frerichs. The inquiry did not result in substantial headway in brokering Frerichs' release. Frerichs's family was a part of the Bring Our Families Home campaign.

On September 19, 2022, Taliban Foreign Minister Amir Khan Muttaqi told reporters in Kabul that his government and a US delegation swapped prisoners at the Afghan capital's airport. Frerichs was exchanged for Bashir Noorzai.

== See also ==
- List of kidnappings
- List of solved missing person cases (2020s)
