= Mellissa Fung =

Canadian journalist

Mellissa Fung OC
- Born: 1972/1973; Hong Kong
- Education: University of British Columbia, Columbia University
- Occupation: Journalist
- Notable credit: CBC News
- Spouse: Paul Workman
- Family: Kellog (father), Joyce (mother)

Mellissa Veronica Fung OC is a Canadian journalist with CBC News, appearing regularly as a field correspondent on The National.

== Education and career ==
Fung and her younger sister are the daughters of Kellog and Joyce Fung. She was born in Hong Kong, and her family moved to Vancouver when she was four years old. There, she attended an all-girls Catholic high school, then completed a Bachelor of Arts at the University of British Columbia where she contributed regularly to the student-run newspaper The Ubyssey. After graduating in 1994, she earned a master's degree from Columbia School of Journalism in 1995. From February 2001 to 2003 she reported for CBC-TV News in Vancouver. Since December 2003, she has served as a national reporter for CBC Television, working out of Toronto and Regina.

In her time as a national correspondent she has covered numerous topics on both Canadian and world affairs, including the Robert Pickton trial, the 2003 SARS outbreak in Canada, the trial of Mike Danton, the 2007 Saskatchewan provincial election, 2008 Summer Olympics in Beijing and uncovering Canada's international sales of toxic asbestos. In 2007 and 2008 she was sent on assignment to Afghanistan to cover the Canadian military presence there.

== 2008 kidnapping ==
In late 2008, Fung was sent on her second assignment to Afghanistan, based out of the Canadian military base at Kandahar.

On October 12, while en route to a refugee camp near Kabul, she was kidnapped by armed men. Fung alerted her employer using her mobile phone and stated that the kidnappers were not Taliban but "bandits". Her translator and driver—two Afghan brothers named Shokoor Feroz and Qaem Feroz—were beaten and left behind by the kidnappers. Before her captors abandoned her for the last week, she was blindfolded and chained to the inside of a tiny, dark cave. Zabiullah Mujahid, a Taliban spokesman in the eastern part of the county, told The Canadian Press that another Islamist group called Hizb-e-Islami was responsible for the abduction. They were later implicated by Afghan authorities in the kidnapping and detained, though CBC publisher John D. Cruickshank expressed confidence in them and stated that they were worried about their conditions in prison.

The kidnapping occurred two days before the 2008 Canadian federal election, and CBC requested a press blackout while negotiations were conducted with the kidnappers, out of concern that widespread media coverage would complicate matters. Though the incident was covered in Afghan press, the blackout was honoured by all Canadian media and Fung's kidnapping remained generally unknown within Canada.

Fung was finally released on November 8, 2008, after weeks of negotiations. A spokesman for the governor of Wardak Province indicated that local tribal elders and provincial council members negotiated Fung's release and that no ransom was paid. However, it was later revealed that Afghan intelligence determined the identity of the kidnapper, abducted his family, then demanded Fung be released in a prisoner exchange.

On November 12, 2008, she was interviewed about her kidnapping by CBC Radio's Anna Maria Tremonti, in Dubai. The interview later earned Tremonti and Fung a gold medal at the 2009 New York Festivals Radio Programming and Promotion Awards.

Fung wrote the book Under an Afghan Sky about her experiences. During an interview with a columnist from The Globe and Mail, she said "I thought it might be cathartic...But it wasn’t." On May 5, 2011, Fung was interviewed by CBC radio and CBC TV to talk about her experience and her book.

In 2021 Fung released the documentary film Captive, which linked her abduction experience to those of three Nigerian women who had been abducted by Boko Haram. The film received a Canadian Screen Award nomination for Best Feature Length Documentary at the 10th Canadian Screen Awards in 2022.

Fung was appointed to the Order of Canada in 2024. She currently lives in Toronto, Canada.

== Novel ==
For a May 2026 book release, Fung collaborated with Canadian crime-fiction writer Louise Penny to author The Last Mandarin, about a world-prominent first generation Chinese-American human rights activist and the daughter in her shadow, propelled "from the Oval Office to Ohio and then ... Hong Kong, [unlocking] old legends and languages long ago invented by women," to confront an explosive conspiracy of international scope.

== See also ==
- List of kidnappings
- Lists of solved missing person cases
- David S. Rohde, another journalist kidnapped by the Taliban in November 2008, leading to a voluntary media blackout.
