= Russia–United States relations =

- Russia: United States

Diplomatic mission
- Embassy of Russia, Washington, D.C.: Embassy of the United States, Moscow

Envoy
- Ambassador Alexander Darchiev: Chargé d'affaires J. Douglas Dykhouse

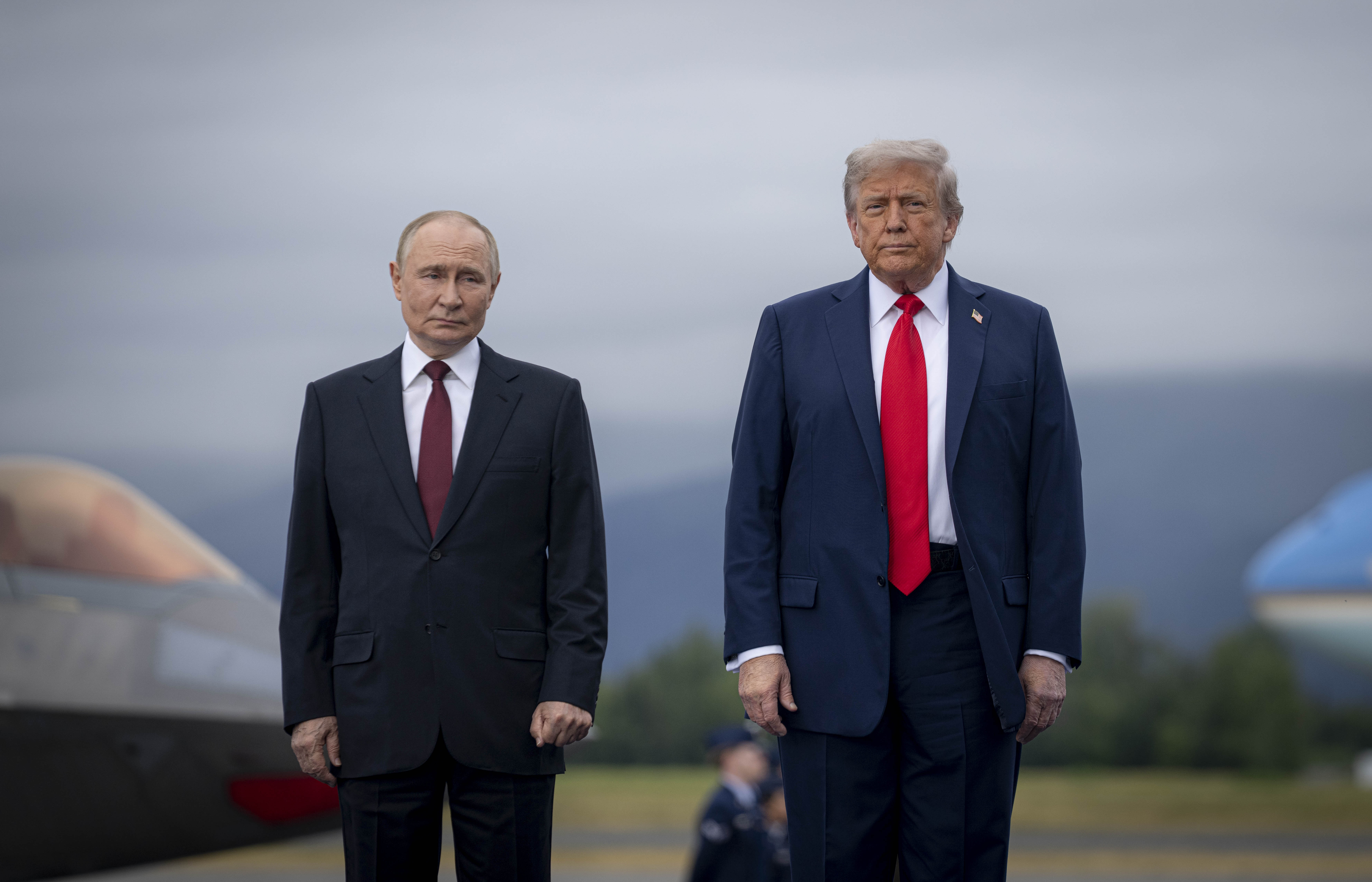
Trump and Putin in Anchorage on August 15, 2025, during the Russian-United States Summit.

The United States and Russia maintain strategic foreign relations since the establishment in 1991, a continuation of the relationship the United States has had with various Russian governments since 1803. While both nations have shared interests in nuclear safety and security, non-proliferation, counterterrorism, and space exploration, their relationship has been shown through a mixture of cooperation, competition, and hostility, with both countries considering one another foreign adversaries for much of their relationship. Since the beginning of the second Trump administration, the US has pursued normalization and the bettering of relations, largely centered around the resolution of the Russian invasion of Ukraine.

After the dissolution of the Soviet Union in 1991 and the end of the Cold War, the relationship was generally warm under Russian president Boris Yeltsin (1991–99). In the early years of Yeltsin's presidency, the United States and Russia established a cooperative relationship and worked closely together to address global issues such as arms control, counterterrorism, and the conflict in Bosnia and Herzegovina. During Yeltsin's second term, United States–Russia relations became more strained. The NATO intervention in Yugoslavia, in particular, the 1999 NATO intervention in Kosovo, was strongly opposed by Yeltsin. Although the Soviet Union had been strongly opposed by the Titovian flavour of independence, Yeltsin saw it as an infringement on Russia's latter-day sphere of influence. Yeltsin also criticized NATO's expansion into Eastern Europe, which he saw as a threat to Russia's security.

After Vladimir Putin became President of Russia in 2000, he initially sought to improve relations with the United States. The two countries cooperated on issues such as counterterrorism and arms control. Putin worked closely with United States president George W. Bush on the war in Afghanistan following the 9/11 attacks. Following Putin's re-election to the Russian presidency in 2012, relations between the two countries were significantly strained due to Russia's annexation of Crimea and the Russian military intervention in Ukraine. Deterioration continued with the Russian military intervention in the Syrian civil war.

Relations further deteriorated during the presidency of Joe Biden following the Russian invasion of Ukraine in 2022. International sanctions imposed since 2014 were significantly expanded by the U.S. and its allies, including several state-owned banks and oligarchs. During the second presidency of Donald Trump, the United States has attempted to normalize relations with Russia and has sided with Russia in the United Nations, voting against a resolution to condemn Russia's invasion of Ukraine in February 2025, in a dramatic departure from the long-standing American position on humanitarian issues since 2014. Defense Secretary Pete Hegseth has also ordered the suspension of offensive cyber operations against Russia. Despite this, relations between the two countries are still poor due to continuation of the war in Ukraine, and further due to the outbreak of the Iran war in 2026.

== Background ==
Russian Empire–United States relations
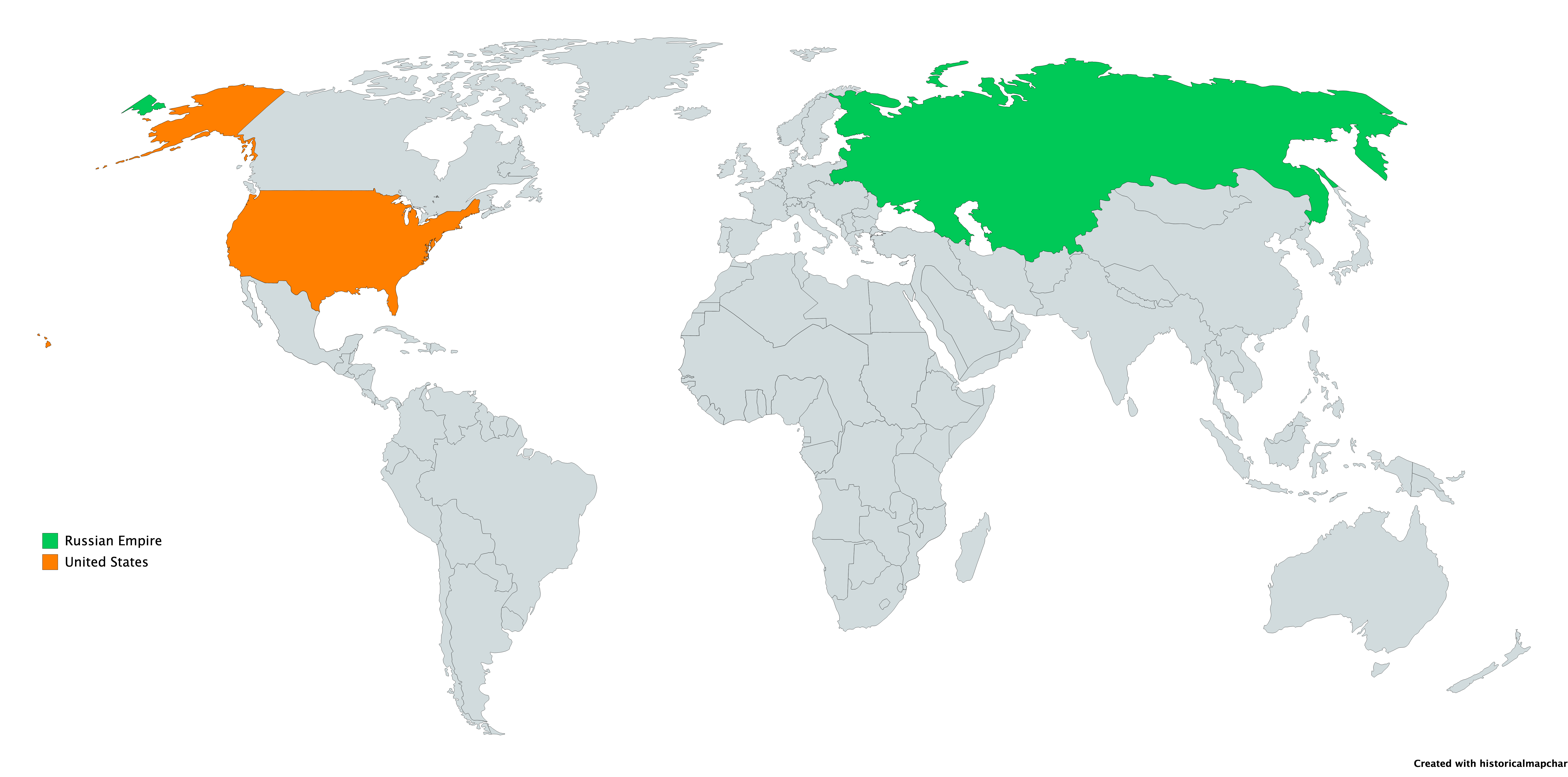

- Russia: United States

=== United States and the Russian Empire ===
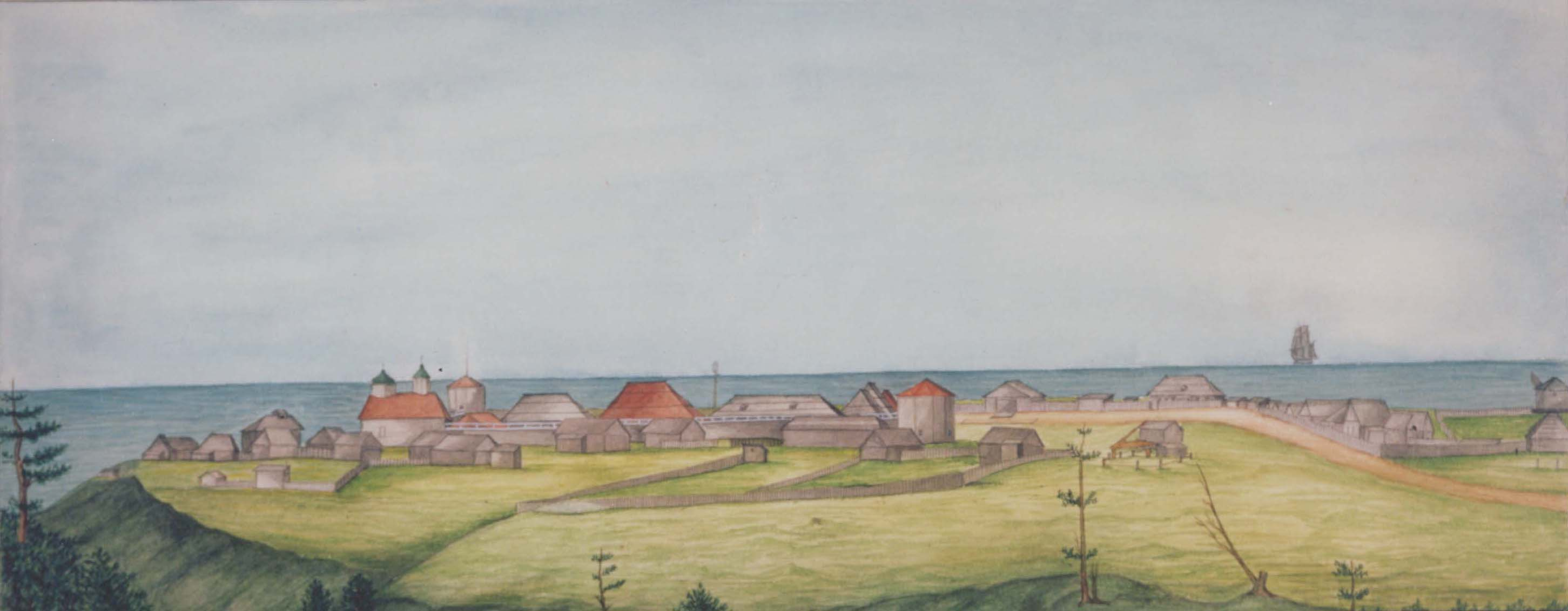
Fort Ross, Russian settlement in California, 1841, by Ilya Gavrilovich Voznesensky.

There was little trade or migration before the late 19th century. Formal diplomatic ties were established in 1809. During the American Civil War, Russia supported the Union, largely because it believed that the U.S. served as a counterbalance to its geopolitical rival, the United Kingdom. In 1863, the Russian Navy's Baltic and Pacific fleets wintered in the American ports of New York and San Francisco, respectively.

Russia operated a small fur-trade operations in Alaska, coupled with missionaries to the natives. By 1861, the project had lost money, threatened to antagonize the Americans, and could not be defended from Britain. It proved practically impossible to entice Russians to permanently migrate to Alaska; only a few hundred were there in 1867. In the Alaska Purchase of 1867, the land was sold to the United States for $7.2 million.

The Russian administrators and military left Alaska, but some missionaries stayed on to minister to the many natives who converted to the Russian Orthodox faith.

After 1880, repeated anti-Jewish pogroms in Russia alienated American elite and public opinion. In 1903, the Kishinev pogrom killed 47 Jews, injured 400, and left 10,000 homeless and dependent on relief. American Jews began large-scale organized financial help and assisted in emigration.

The Treaty of Portsmouth (1905), brokered by United States president Theodore Roosevelt, ended the Russo-Japanese War.

During World War I, the United States declaration of war on Germany (1917) came after Nicholas II had abdicated as a result of the February Revolution. When the tsar was still in power, many Americans deplored fighting a war with him as an ally. With him gone, the Wilson administration used the new provisional government to describe how the democratic nations were fighting against autocratic old empires of Germany and Austria-Hungary. During the war, the American Expeditionary Forces were just starting to see battle when the October Revolution happened in which the Bolsheviks overthrew the provisional government and removed Russia from the war.

Before the armistice in November 1918, the Americans had helped the Allied intervention in the Russian Civil War with the Polar Bear Expedition and the American Expeditionary Force Siberia. The Americans' goal was not necessarily ideological but rather to prevent the German enemy from gaining access to war supplies controlled by the Bolsheviks, though the United States also tacitly supported the White movement against the Bolsheviks.

From 1820 until 1917, about 3.3 million immigrants arrived in the U.S. from the Russian Empire. Most were Jews, Poles, or Lithuanians; only 100,000 were ethnic Russians.

=== United States and the Soviet Union ===
Soviet–American relations
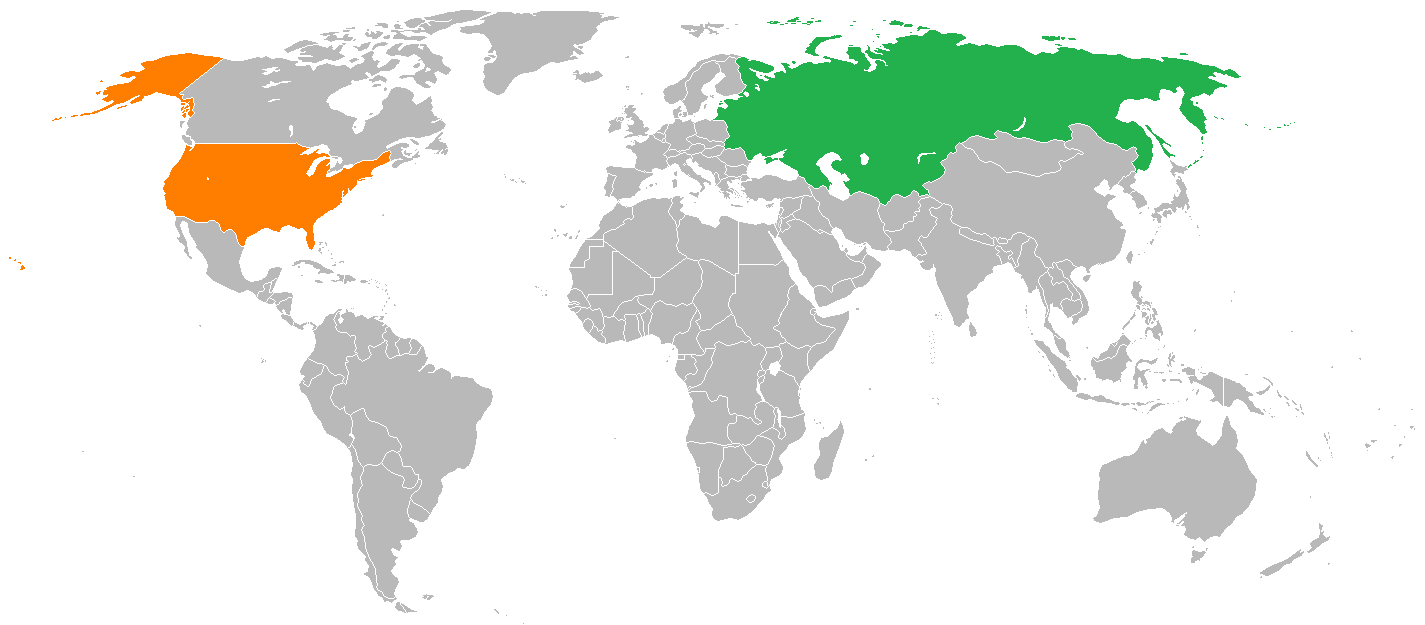

- Soviet Union: United States

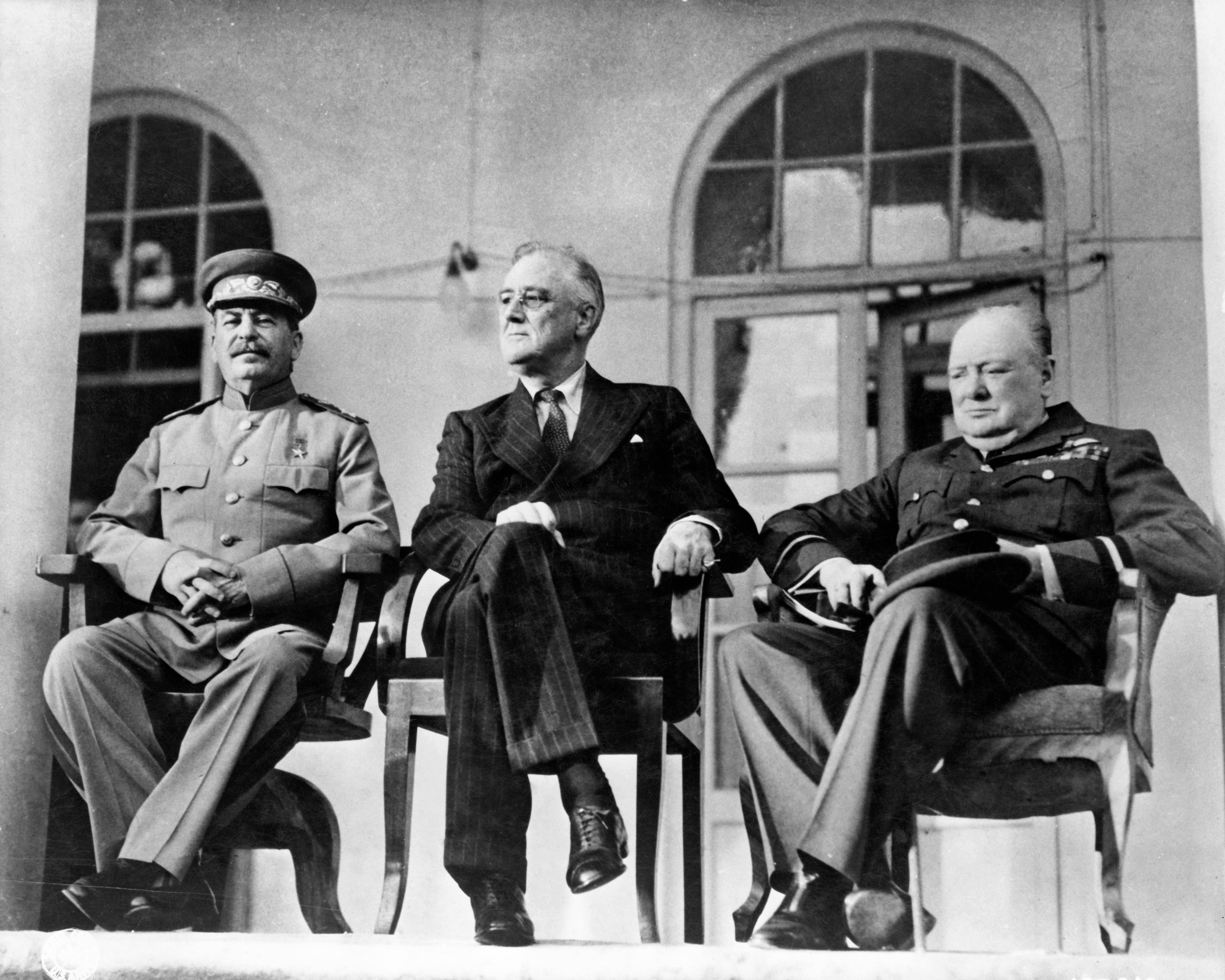
Soviet general secretary Joseph Stalin, U.S. president Franklin D. Roosevelt, and UK prime minister Winston Churchill in Tehran, Iran in November 1943.

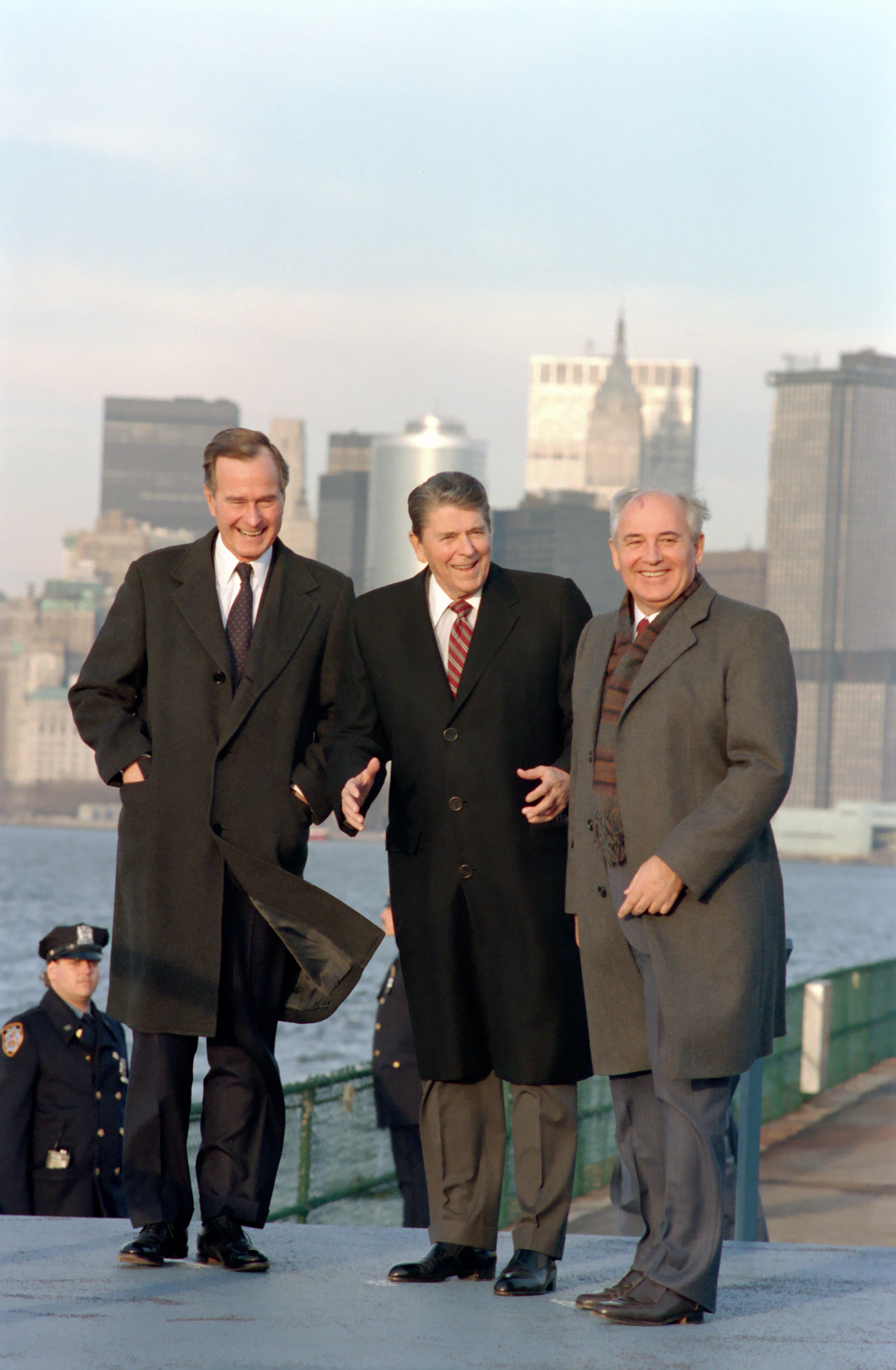
U.S. vice president George H. W. Bush and President Ronald Reagan with Soviet general secretary Mikhail Gorbachev in New York, 1988.

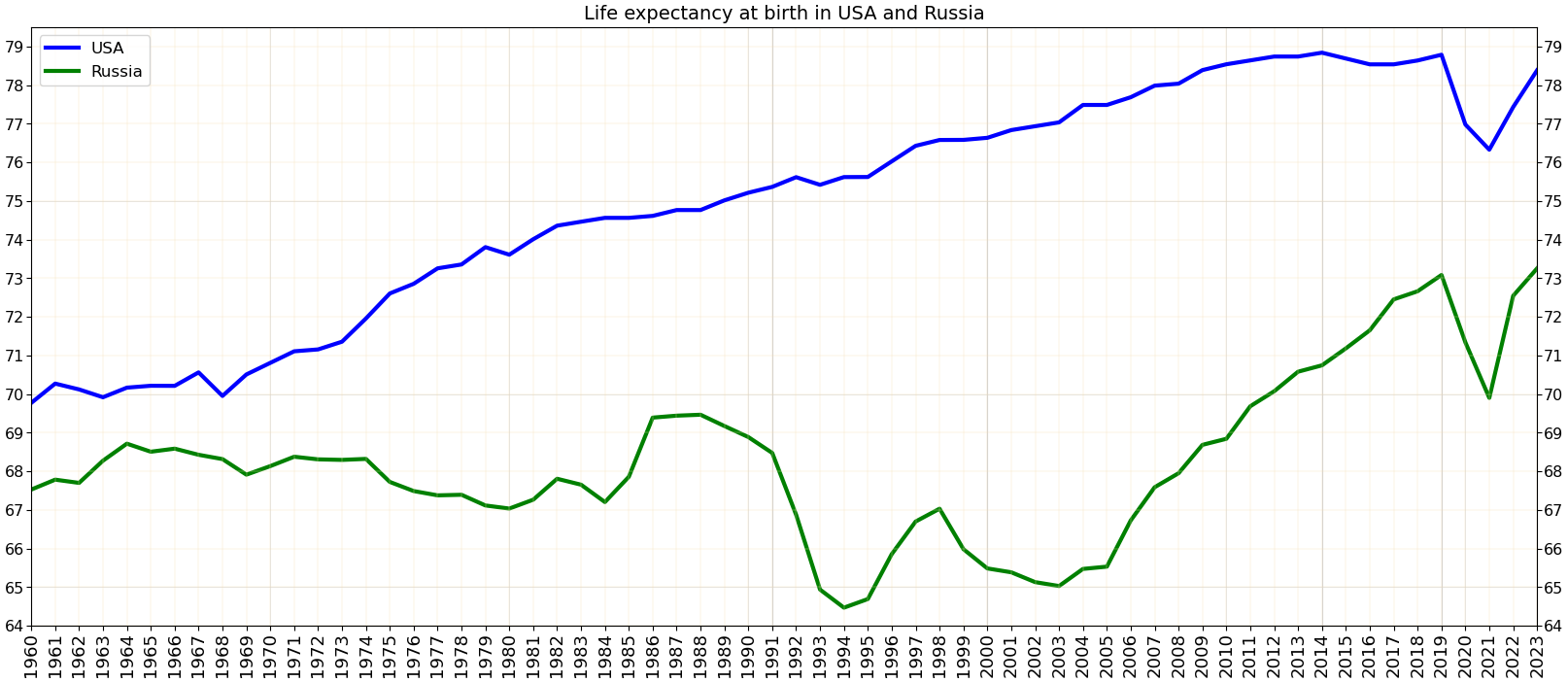
Comparison of life expectancy in the US and Russia since 1960

By 1921, after the Bolsheviks gained the upper hand in the Russian Civil War, executed the Romanov imperial family, repudiated the tsarist debt, and called for a world revolution by the working class, it was regarded as a pariah nation by most of the world. Beyond the Russian Civil War, relations were also dogged by claims of American companies for compensation for the nationalized industries they had invested in. The U.S., while starting to develop trade and economic ties, was the last major world power that continued to refuse to formally recognize the Soviet government. The United States and Soviet Russia established diplomatic relations in November 1933.

The United States and the Soviet Union, along with Britain, were the leaders of the Allies against the Axis powers during World War II. Following the onset of the Cold War in 1947, the North Atlantic Treaty was signed by the U.S., Canada, and several Western European nations, on April 4, 1949, a treaty that established the North Atlantic Treaty Organization (NATO) designed to provide collective security against the Soviet Union.

The first bilateral treaty between the U.S. and Soviet Russia/USSR was a consular convention signed in Moscow in June 1964. In 1975, the Helsinki Final Act was signed by a multitude of countries, including the USSR and the US, and, while not having a binding legal power of a treaty, it effectively signified the U.S.-led West's recognition of the Soviet Union's dominance in Eastern Europe and acceptance of the Soviet annexation of Estonia, Latvia and Lithuania that had been effected in 1940. The Act came to play a role in subsequently ending the Cold War.

In the 1970s—1980s, the USSR and the U.S. signed a series of arms control treaties such as the Anti-Ballistic Missile Treaty (1972), two Strategic Arms Limitation treaties (SALT), the Intermediate-Range Nuclear Forces Treaty (1987); in July 1991 the Strategic Arms Reduction Treaty was concluded.

In the late 1980s, Eastern Europe nations took advantage of the relaxation of Soviet control under General Secretary Mikhail Gorbachev and began to break away from communist rule. The relationship greatly improved in the final years of the USSR.

On December 3, 1989, Soviet general secretary Gorbachev and U.S. president George H. W. Bush declared the Cold War over at the Malta Summit.

Both countries agreed to cut their strategic nuclear weapons by 30 percent, and the Soviet Union promised to reduce its intercontinental ballistic missile force by 50 percent. In August 1991, hard-line Communists launched a coup against Gorbachev; while the coup quickly fell apart, it broke the remaining power of Gorbachev and the central Soviet government. Later that month, Gorbachev resigned as general secretary of the Communist party, but remained president of the Soviet Union, and Russian president Boris Yeltsin ordered the seizure of Soviet property. Gorbachev clung to power as the president of the Soviet Union until December 25, 1991, when the Soviet Union dissolved. Fifteen states emerged from the Soviet Union, with the largest and most populous one, Russia, taking full responsibility for all the rights and obligations of the USSR under the Charter of the United Nations, including the financial obligations. As such, Russia assumed the Soviet Union's UN membership and permanent membership on the Security Council, nuclear stockpile and the control over the armed forces; Soviet embassies abroad became Russian embassies. Bush and Yeltsin met in February 1992, declaring a new era of "friendship and partnership". In January 1993, Bush and Yeltsin agreed to START II, which provided for further nuclear arms reductions on top of the original START treaty.

== History ==
=== Dissolution of the Soviet Union through Yeltsin's terms (1991–99) ===
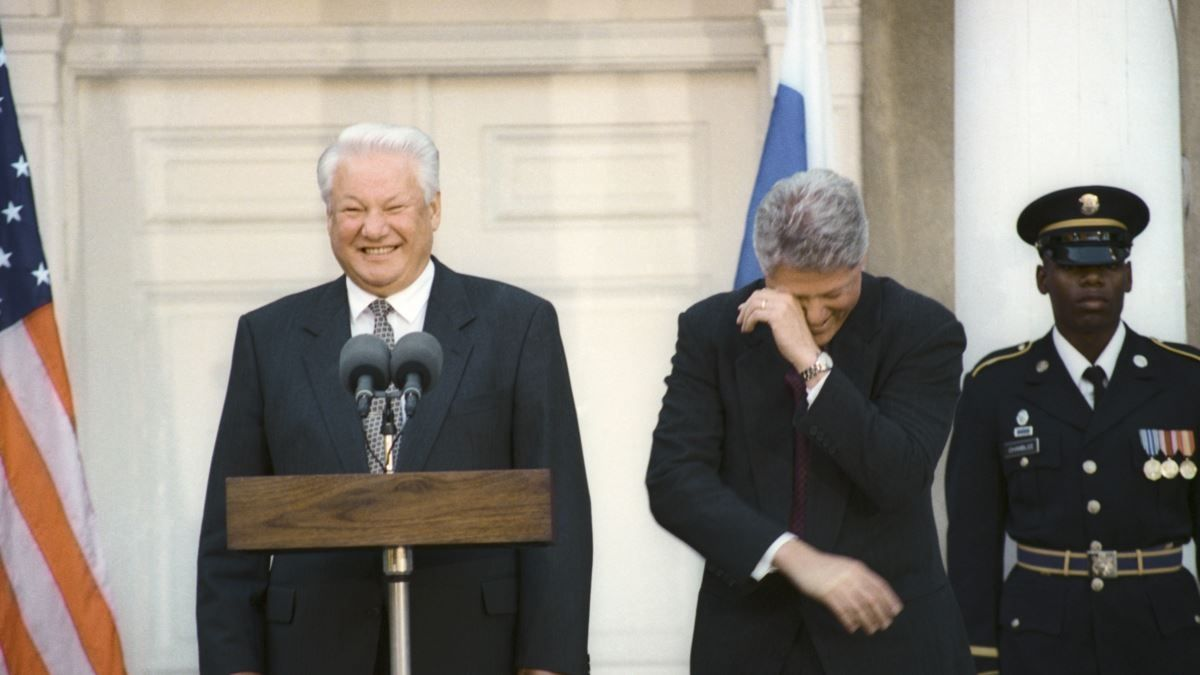
Russian president Boris Yeltsin and U.S. president Bill Clinton in the White House, October 1995.

With Communist politicians and parties in Eastern Europe mostly defunct, on December 26, 1991, the Soviet Union self-dissolved, and the Commonwealth of Independent States, a loose association was formed on December 8–21 by eventually 12 of the 15 Soviet constituent Union Republics, leaving out earlier the three Baltic states. The Russian Soviet Federative Socialist Republic became the Russian Federation. It was now an independent state that inherited the USSR's UN Security Council permanent membership and became the sole continuator state to the USSR and one of 12 successor states to the USSR.

Security issues have always been among the most important between the U.S. and Russia. Immediately after the signing of the Agreement establishing the Commonwealth of Independent States on December 8, 1991, Russian president Yeltsin called U.S. president George H. W. Bush and specifically read him Article 6 of the Agreement. "First of all, I talked with USSR Minister of Defense Shaposhnikov. I want to read the 6th Article of the Agreement. As a matter of fact Shaposhnikov fully agreed and supported our position. I am now reading Article 6." ... "Please note well the next paragraph, Mr. President (and I urge the interpreter to translate this precisely)." ... "Dear George, I am finished. This is extremely, extremely important. Because of the tradition between us, I couldn't even wait ten minutes to call you." According to the text of Article 6, Russia, Ukraine and Belarus form a "common military and strategic space" and "united armed forces."

Current US secretary of state James Baker stated that no one but Russia could control Soviet nuclear weapons, in particular, making a statement on December 10, 1991, at Princeton University.

On December 21, 1991, Boris Yeltsin, President of Russia, sent a letter to NATO asking it to consider accepting Russia as a member of the alliance sometime in the future. In the letter to NATO, Yeltsin stated, "This would contribute to an atmosphere of mutual understanding and trust and would strengthen stability and cooperation on the European continent. We regard this relationship as serious and wish to develop this dialog on all fronts, both on the political and military levels. Today we raise the issue of Russia's membership in NATO, however, we see this as a long-term political goal." The Collective Security Treaty within the framework of the Commonwealth of Independent States was signed On May 15, 1992. (A separate organization outside the CIS framework called Collective Security Treaty Organization was created in 2002).

On January 31, 1992, Yeltsin attended a UN Security Council meeting and said: "I think the time has come to consider creating a global defence system for the world community. We are ready to participate actively in building and putting in place a pan-European collective security system – in particular during the Vienna talks and the upcoming post-Helsinki-II talks on security and cooperation in Europe. Russia regards the United States and the West not as mere partners but rather as allies.

Strobe Talbott, who was Washington's chief expert on Russia, has argued that Clinton hit it off with Russian Boris Yeltsin, the president of Russia 1991–1999:

The personal diplomacy between Clinton and Yeltsin, augmented by the channel that Gore developed with Yeltsin's longest-serving prime minister, Victor Chernomyrdin, yielded half a dozen major understandings that either resolved or alleviated disputes over Russia's role in the post–cold war world. The two presidents were the negotiators in chief of agreements to halt the sale of Russian rocket parts to India; remove Soviet-era nuclear missiles from Ukraine in exchange for Russian assurances of Ukraine's sovereignty and security; withdraw Russian troops from the Baltic states; institutionalize cooperation between Russia and an expanding NATO; lay the ground for the Baltic states to join the alliance; and ensure the participation of the Russian military in Balkan peacekeeping and of Russian diplomacy in the settlement of NATO's air war against Serbia.

As the collapse of the Soviet Union appeared imminent, the United States and their NATO allies grew concerned of the risk of nuclear weapons held in the Soviet republics falling into enemy hands. The Cooperative Threat Reduction (CTR) program was initiated by the Nunn–Lugar Act (really the Soviet Nuclear Threat Reduction Act of 1991), which was authored and cosponsored by Sens. Sam Nunn (D-GA) and Richard Lugar (R-IN). According to the CTR website, the purpose of the CTR Program was originally "to secure and dismantle weapons of mass destruction and their associated infrastructure in former Soviet Union states."

Relations between Yeltsin and the administrations of George H. W. Bush (1989–1993) and Bill Clinton (1993–2001) started off well, but deteriorated after 1997. Yeltsin and his foreign minister Andrey Kozyrev made a high priority Russia's full membership into the family of democratic nations. They wanted to be a partner of the United States. At home they tried to create democratic institutions and a free-market capitalist system.

In 1993, both nations signed the START II arms control treaty that was designed to ban the use of multiple independently targetable reentry vehicles (MIRVs) on intercontinental ballistic missiles (ICBMs). The treaty was eventually ratified by both countries, yet it was never implemented and was formally abandoned in 2002, following the U.S.'s withdrawal from the 1972 Anti-Ballistic Missile Treaty.

Clinton and Yeltsin were personally friendly. Washington encouraged the rapid transition to a liberal capitalist system in Russia. Clinton provided rich talking points but provided less than $3 billion, and much was paid to American contractors. The Russians—aware of the Marshall Plan in the 1940s—had counted on far larger sums. A 1995 NATO study on enlarging the alliance, and the 1999 admission of the Czech Republic, Hungary, and Poland into NATO, alarmed Russia. With the Cold War over, Russians felt NATO's original role was no longer needed. It feared its dramatic move eastward meant an escalation of NATO's historic role in containment of Russian goals. Fears over NATO enlargement contributed to the rise of Vladimir Putin and his emphasis on Russian nationalism and security issues.

On January 14, 1994, Russian president Boris Yeltsin said at a meeting with his American counterpart Bill Clinton in Novo-Ogaryovo. "Russia has to be the first country to join NATO. Then the others from Central and Eastern Europe can come in. There should be a kind of cartel of the U.S., Russia, and the Europeans to help ensure and improve world security." "In truth, Russia is not yet ready to join NATO. Russia firsts needs to start thinking about reactions in other areas. There is a potential Chinese reaction. As a result, without cooperation between the two of us it is hard to envisage continuation of a peaceful and stable world. If we continue to work together as you suggest, we can do much to ensure peace and stability for Europe and for the rest of the world."

In September 1994, Boris Yeltsin addressed the UN General Assembly and mentioned the role of the CSCE in the European security system. Russia had previously proposed the idea of increasing the role of the CSCE to the detriment of NATO. Yeltsin's national security aide Yuri Baturin noted that after the end of the Cold War, 'the time of NATO has passed,' and therefore the alliance 'should change its mechanisms and goals taking into account Russia's military and political weight.' Baturin believes that 'a new mechanism of European security could be born from the combination of the CSCE and NATO, where the CSCE bodies would represent the political and diplomatic part, and NATO bodies would represent the military part.' But Yeltsin himself did not make such a statement. By 1995 the Agreement on the creation the Commonwealth of Independent States, including the Article 6 on "common military and strategic space", came into force for all 12 countries.

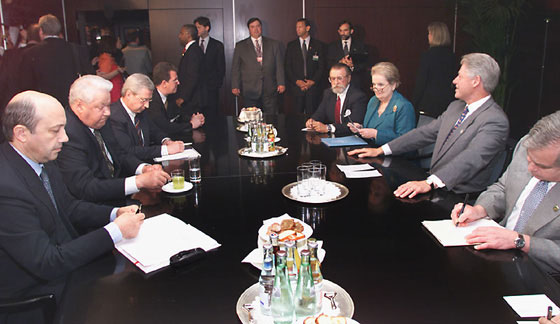
Yeltsin and Clinton at Cologne's Renaissance House, June 1999.

On March 21, 1997, Yeltsin stated to Bill Clinton in Finland: "Our position has not changed. It remains a mistake for NATO to move eastward. But I need to take steps to alleviate the negative consequences of this for Russia. I am prepared to enter into an agreement with NATO not because I want to but because it is a forced step. There is no other solution for today. The principal issues for me are the following. The agreement must be legally binding – signed by all 16 Allies. Decisions by NATO are not to be taken without taking into account the concerns or opinions of Russia. Also, nuclear and conventional arms cannot move eastward into new members to the borders of Russia, thus creating a new cordon sanitaire aimed at Russia. But one thing is very important: enlargement shouldn't embrace the former Soviet republics. I cannot sign any agreement without such language. Especially Ukraine. If you get them involved, it will create difficulties in our talks with Ukraine on a number of issues."

Russia stridently opposed the U.S.-led NATO military operation against Serbia and Montenegro over Kosovo that began in March 1999. In December 1999, while on a visit to China, President Yeltsin verbally assailed Clinton for criticizing Russia's tactics in Chechnya (at the start of the Second Chechen War) emphatically stating that Russia remained a nuclear power.

=== Putin and George W. Bush (2001–2009) ===
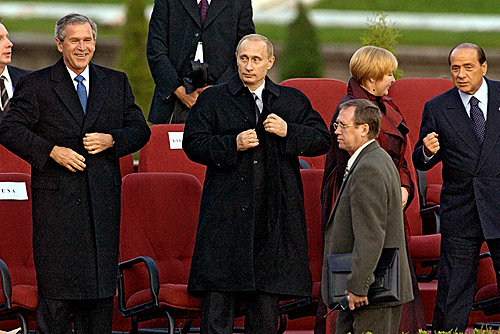
Russia strongly opposed the U.S.-led 2003 invasion of Iraq.

In 2001, in response to the terrorist attacks on September 11, the new Russian president Vladimir Putin quickly announced strong support. Terrorism against Russia was already high on Putin's agenda and he found common ground by supporting the American/NATO invasion of Afghanistan to destroy the Taliban that had harbored the Al-Qaeda terrorists. By 2002, however, the two countries were escalating their disagreements. Russia became more assertive in international affairs; George W. Bush took an increasingly unilateral course in foreign policy.

In 2002, the United States withdrew from the Anti-Ballistic Missile Treaty in order to move forward with plans for a missile defense system. Putin called the decision a mistake. Russia strongly opposed the 2003 invasion of Iraq, though without exercising its veto in the United Nations Security Council. Russia has regarded the expansion of NATO into the old Eastern Bloc, and U.S. efforts to gain access to Central Asian oil and natural gas as a potentially hostile encroachment on Russia's sphere of influence. The Russian leadership blamed U.S. officials for encouraging anti-Russian revolts during the Rose Revolution in Georgia in 2003 and the Orange Revolution in Ukraine in 2004. Putin saw intrusions into Russia's historic sphere of interest.

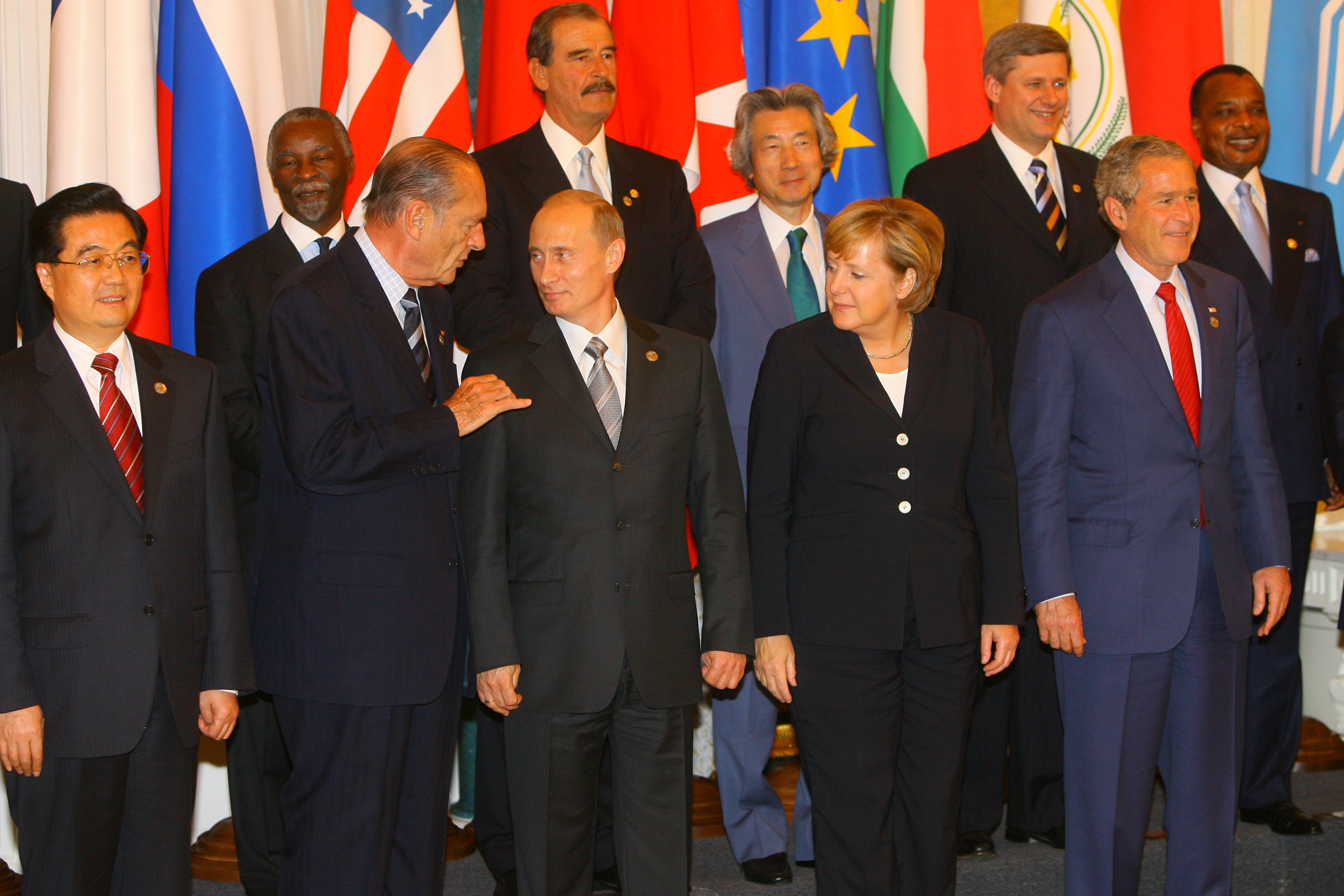
Vladimir Putin with George W. Bush and other Western leaders at 32nd G8 summit in Moscow, July 2006.

Russia condemned the unilateral declaration of independence of Kosovo from Serbia in February 2008, stating they "expect the UN mission and NATO-led forces in Kosovo to take immediate action to carry out their mandate [...] including the annulling of the decisions of Pristina's self-governing organs and the taking of tough administrative measures against them." Russian president Putin described the recognition of Kosovo's independence by the United States and other Western countries as "a terrible precedent, which will de facto blow apart the whole system of international relations, developed not over decades, but over centuries", and that "they have not thought through the results of what they are doing. At the end of the day it is a two-ended stick and the second end will come back and hit them in the face". In March 2014, Russia used Kosovo's declaration of independence as a justification for recognizing the independence of Crimea, citing the so-called "Kosovo independence precedent".

In early 2008, President George W. Bush vowed full support for admitting Ukraine and Georgia into NATO, despite Russia's opposition to the further eastward expansion of NATO. Russia's Deputy Foreign Minister Grigory Karasin warned that any incorporation of Ukraine into NATO would cause a "deep crisis" in Russia–Ukraine relations and also negatively affect Russia's relations with the West.

==== Controversy over U.S. plan to station missiles in Poland (2007–2008) ====
In March 2007, the U.S. announced plans to build an anti-ballistic missile defense installation in Poland along with a radar station in the Czech Republic. Both nations were former Warsaw Pact members and both had repudiated Communism and Russian interference. U.S. officials said that the system was intended to protect the United States and Europe from possible nuclear missile attacks by Iran or North Korea. Russia, however, viewed the new system as a potential threat and, in response, tested a long-range intercontinental ballistic missile, the RS-24, which it claimed could defeat any defense system. Putin warned the U.S. that these new tensions could turn Europe into a powder keg. On June 3, 2007, Putin warned that if the United States built the missile defense system, Russia would consider targeting missiles at Poland and the Czech Republic.

In October 2007, Vladimir Putin visited Iran to discuss Russia's aid to Iran's nuclear power program and "insisted that the use of force was unacceptable." On October 17, Bush stated "if you're interested in avoiding World War III, it seems like you ought to be interested in preventing them from having the knowledge necessary to make a nuclear weapon," understood as a message to Putin. A week later, Putin compared U.S. plans to put up a missile defense system near Russia's border as analogous to when the Soviet Union deployed missiles in Cuba, prompting the Cuban Missile Crisis.

In July 2008, Russia announced that if a U.S. anti-missile shield was deployed near the Russian border, it would have to react militarily. The statement from the Russian foreign ministry said, "If an American strategic anti-missile shield starts to be deployed near our borders, we will be forced to react not in a diplomatic fashion but with military-technical means." Later, Russia's ambassador to the United Nations Vitaly Churkin said that "military-technical means" did not mean military action, but more likely a change in Russia's strategic posture, perhaps by redeploying its own missiles.

On August 14, 2008, the U.S. and Poland agreed to have 10 two-stage missile interceptors – made by Orbital Sciences Corporation – placed in Poland, as part of a missile shield to defend Europe and the U.S. from a possible missile attack by Iran. In return, the U.S. agreed to move a battery of MIM-104 Patriot missiles to Poland. The missile battery was to be staffed – at least temporarily – by U.S. Military personnel. The U.S. also pledged to defend Poland, a NATO member, quicker than NATO would in the event of an attack. Additionally, the Czech Republic recently agreed to allow the placement of a radar-tracking station in their country, despite public opinion polls showing that the majority of Czechs were against the plans and only 18% supported it. The radar-tracking station in the Czech Republic would also be part of the missile defense shield. After the agreement was announced, Russian officials said defences on Russia's borders would be increased and that they foresaw harm in bilateral relations with the United States.

==== Russian-Georgian clash (August 2008) ====
In August 2008, United States-Russia bilateral relations became further strained, when Russia and Georgia fought a five-day war over the Russian-backed self-proclaimed republics of South Ossetia and Abkhazia. President Bush said to Russia, "Bullying and intimidation are not acceptable ways to conduct foreign policy in the 21st century."

=== Obama administration (2009–2017) ===
==== "Reset" under Obama and Medvedev (2009–11) ====
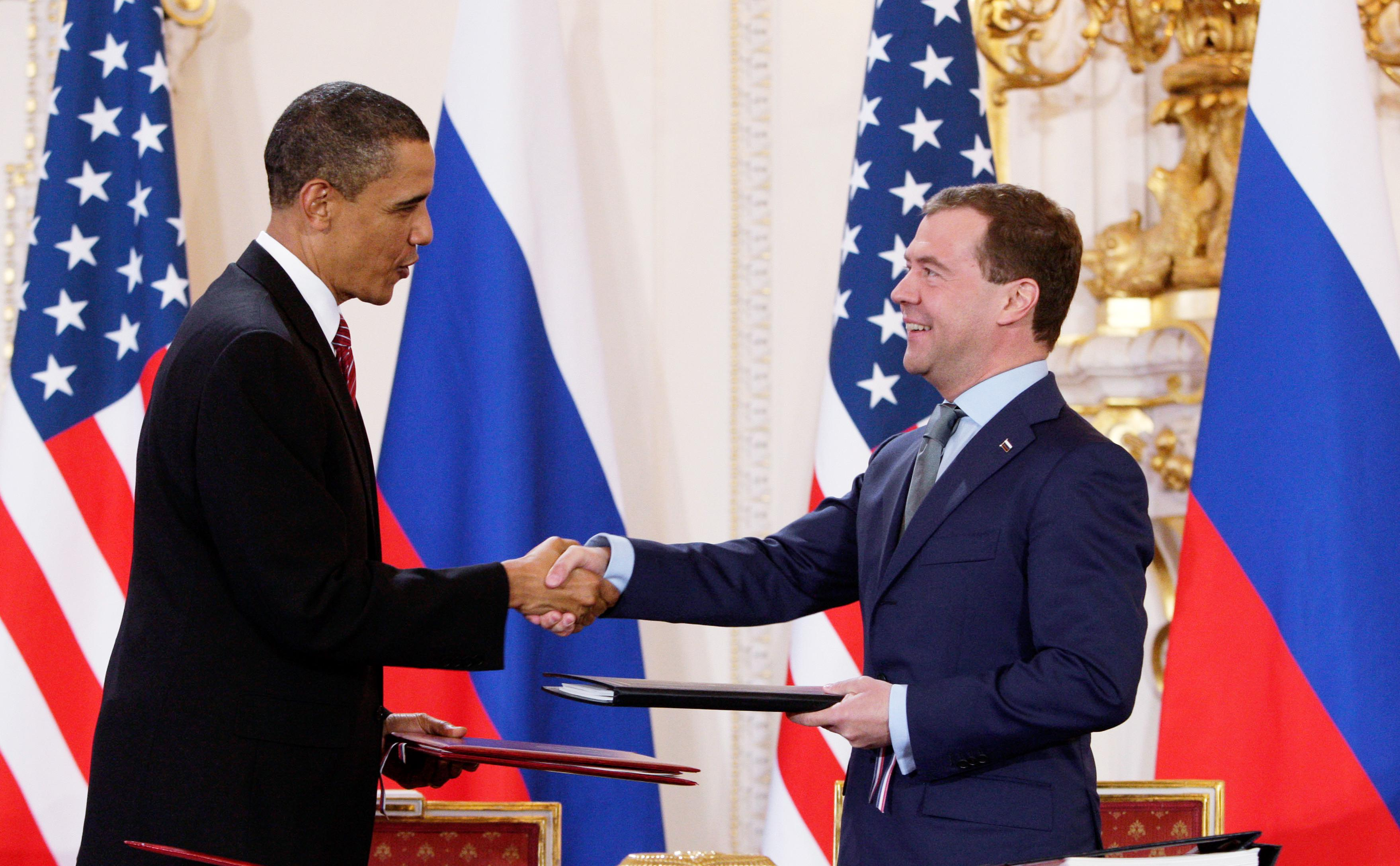
U.S. president Barack Obama and Russian president Dmitry Medvedev after signing the New START treaty

Despite U.S.–Russia relations becoming strained during the Bush administration, Russian president Dmitry Medvedev (president from May 2008 until May 2012, with Vladimir Putin as Prime Minister during this period) and U.S. president Barack Obama struck a warm tone at the 2009 G20 summit in London and released a joint statement that promised a "fresh start" in Russia–United States relations. The statement also called on Iran to abandon its nuclear program and to permit foreign inspectors into the country.

In March 2009, U.S. secretary of state Hillary Clinton and her Russian counterpart Sergey Lavrov symbolically pressed a "reset" button. The gag fell short as the Russian translation on the button was misspelt by the State Department and actually meant "overload" instead of "reset". After making a few jokes and laughs, they decided to press the button anyway to symbolise friendship.

In early July 2009, Obama visited Moscow where he had meetings with President Medvedev and Prime Minister Putin. Speaking at the New Economic School Obama told a large gathering, "America wants a strong, peaceful and prosperous Russia. This belief is rooted in our respect for the Russian people, and a shared history between our nations that goes beyond competition." Days after president Obama's visit to Moscow, U.S. vice president Joe Biden, noting that the U.S. was "vastly underestimat[ing] the hand that [it] h[e]ld", told a U.S. newspaper that Russia, with its population base shrinking and the economy "withering", would have to make accommodations to the West on a wide range of national-security issues.

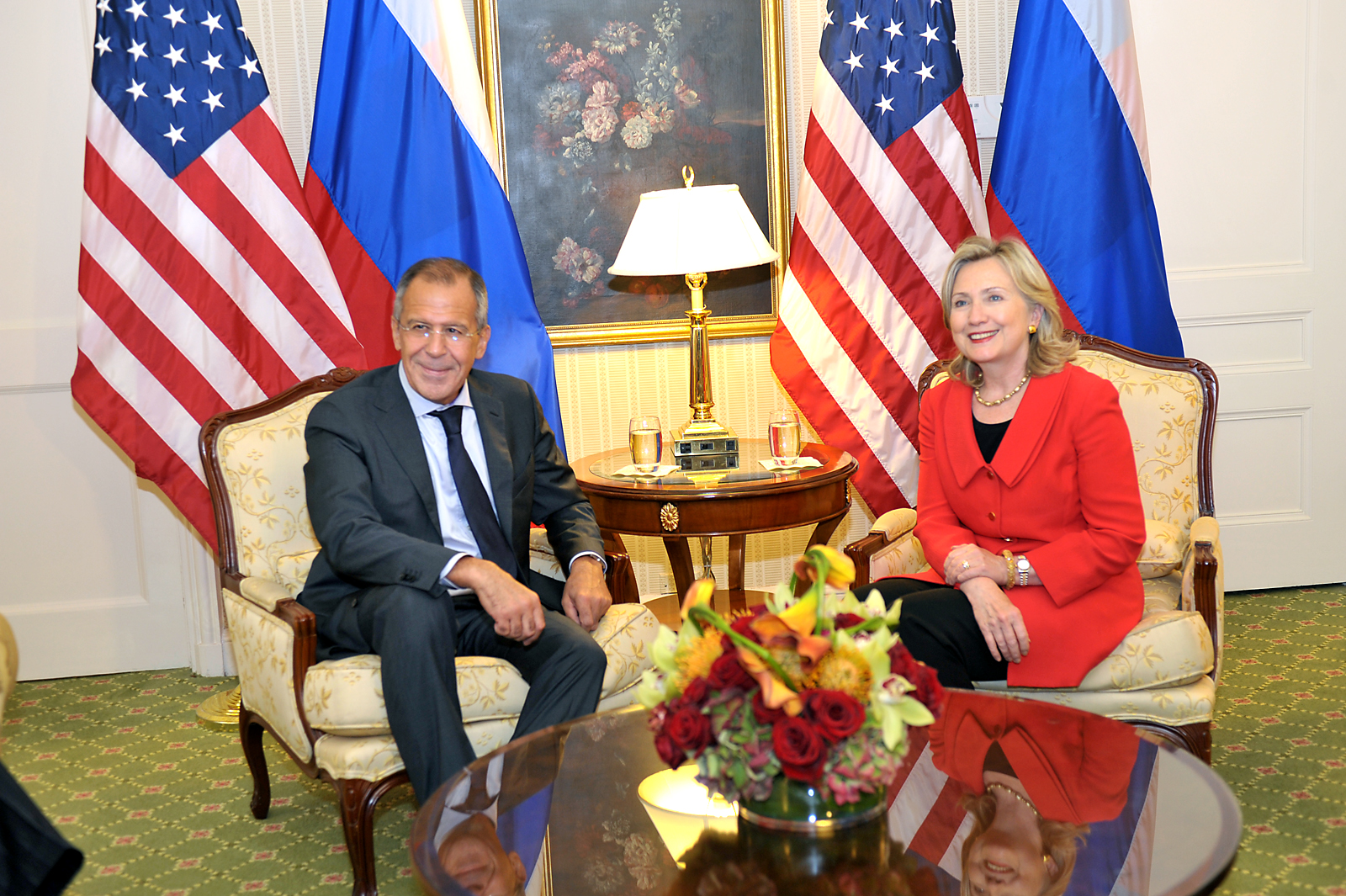
Russian foreign minister Sergey Lavrov with U.S. secretary of state Hillary Clinton at the Waldorf Astoria New York in September 2010

In March 2010, the United States and Russia reached an agreement to reduce their stockpiles of nuclear weapons. The new nuclear arms reduction treaty (called New START) was signed by President Obama and President Medvedev on April 8, 2010. The agreement cut the number of long-range nuclear weapons held by each side to about 1,500, down from the current 1,700 to 2,200 set by the Moscow Treaty of 2002. The New START replaced the 1991 Strategic Arms Reduction Treaty, which expired in December 2009.

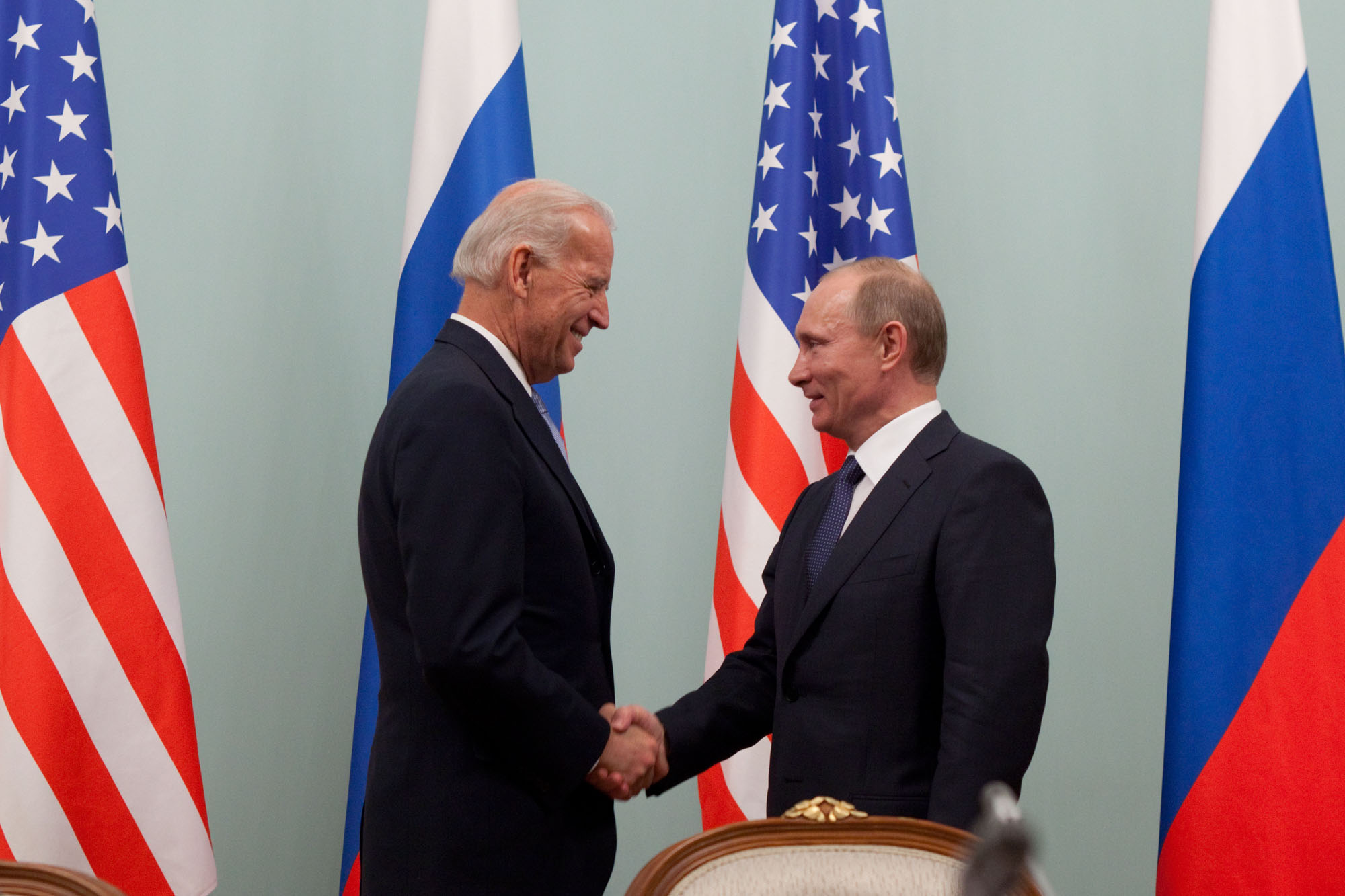
U.S. vice president Joe Biden and Russian prime minister Vladimir Putin in Moscow, Russia, in March 2011

On a visit to Moscow in March 2011, U.S. vice president Joe Biden reiterated Washington's support for Russia's accession to the World Trade Organization; he also had a meeting with Russia's leading human rights and opposition leaders where he reportedly told the gathering at the U.S. ambassador's Spaso House residence that it would be better for Russia if Putin did not run for re-election in 2012.

Through 2020, this was the only time Biden and Putin had met. After an official group meeting Biden characterized in his memoir as "argumentative," he and Putin met privately, with Biden saying "Mr. Prime Minister, I'm looking into your eyes," (a reference to a 2001 meeting between Putin and President Bush, who later said "I looked the man in the eye...I was able to get a sense of his soul"). Biden continued, "I don't think you have a soul." Putin replied, "We understand each other." Biden was elected president in 2020.

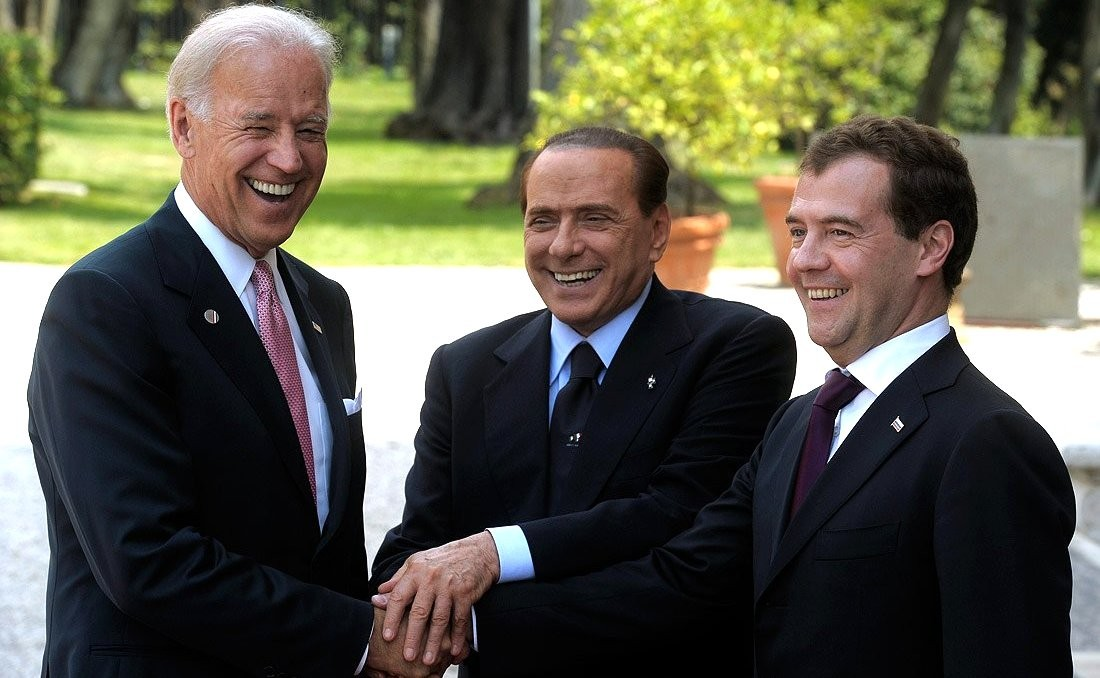
Joe Biden, Italian prime minister Silvio Berlusconi, and Russian president Dmitry Medvedev meeting in Italy in June 2011

The 2011 military intervention in Libya prompted a widespread wave of criticism from several world leaders, including Russian president Medvedev and Russian prime minister Putin, who said that "[UNSC Resolution 1973] is defective and flawed...It allows everything. It resembles medieval calls for crusades."

At the start of the mass protests that began in Russia after the legislative election in early December 2011, prime minister Vladimir Putin accused the United States of interference and inciting unrest, specifically saying that secretary of state Hillary Clinton had sent "a signal" to "some actors in our country"; his comments were seen as indication of a breakdown in the Obama administration's effort to "reset" the relationship.

By 2012, it was clear that a genuine reset never happened and relations remained sour. Factors in the West included traditional mistrust and fear, an increasing drift away from democracy by Russia, and a demand in Eastern Europe for closer political, economic and military integration with the West. From Russia factors included a move away from democracy by Putin, expectations of regaining superpower status and the tactic of manipulating trade policies and encouraging divisions within NATO.

==== Increasing tensions during Putin's third term (2012–2015) ====
In mid-September 2013, the United States and Russia made a deal whereby Syria's chemical weapons would be placed under international control and eventually destroyed; President Obama welcomed the agreement that was shortly after enshrined in the UNSC Resolution 2118. The Obama administration was criticised for having used the chemical weapons deal as an ineffectual substitute for military action that Obama had promised in the event of use of chemical weapons by the Syrian government. In George Robertson's view, as well as many others', the failure of Obama to follow through on his 2013 "red line" and take promised military action badly hurt his credibility and that of the United States with Putin and other world leaders.

Obama acknowledged Russia's role in securing the deal to limit Iran's nuclear program that was reached in July 2015, and personally thanked Putin for Russia's role in the relevant negotiations.

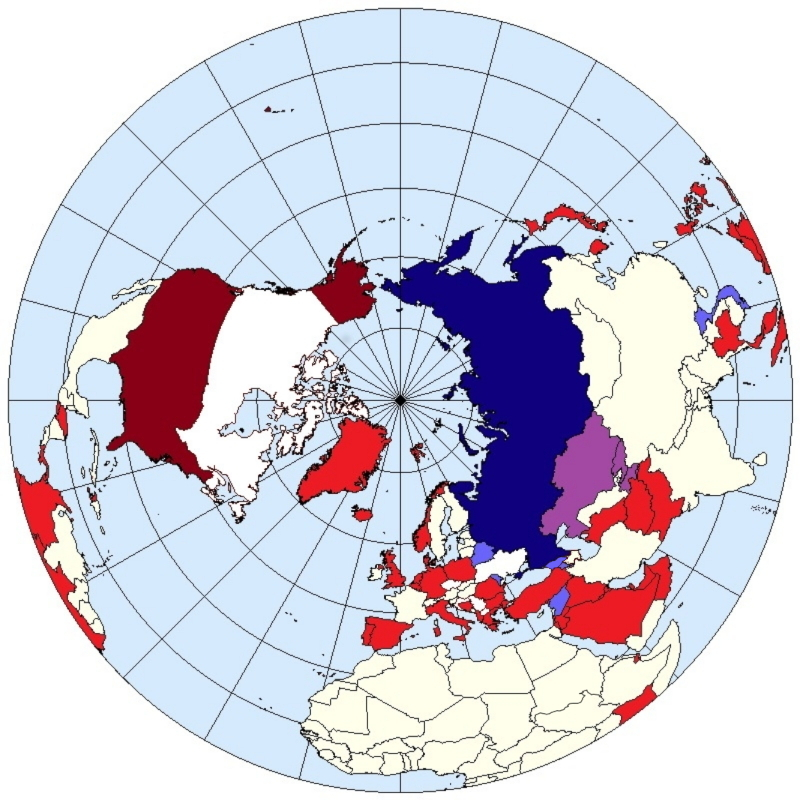
American (red) and Russian (blue) military bases as of 2014

In May 2012, Russian general Nikolay Yegorovich Makarov said that there was a possibility of a preemptive strike on missile defense sites in Eastern Europe, to apply pressure to the United States regarding Russia's demands. Later in August 2012, it was revealed that an Akula-class submarine had conducted a patrol within the Gulf of Mexico without being detected, raising alarms of the U.S. Navy's anti-submarine warfare capabilities.

On December 14, 2012, U.S. president Barack Obama signed the Magnitsky Act, which "[imposed] U.S. travel and financial restrictions on human rights abusers in Russia". On December 28, 2012, Russian president Vladimir Putin signed a bill, widely seen as retaliatory, that banned any United States citizen from adopting children from Russia.

On February 12, 2013, hours before the 2013 State of the Union Address by U.S. president Obama, two Russian Tu-95 Bear strategic bombers, reportedly equipped with nuclear-tipped cruise missiles, circled the U.S. territory of Guam. Air Force F-15 jets based on Andersen Air Force Base were scrambled to intercept the aircraft. The Russian aircraft reportedly "were intercepted and left the area in a northbound direction."

At the end of 2013, Russia announced that a rearmament of the Kozelsk, Novosibirsk, Tagil Rocket divisions with advanced RS-24 Yars intercontinental ballistic missiles was going ahead.

In July 2014, the U.S. government formally accused Russia of having violated the 1987 Intermediate-Range Nuclear Forces (INF) Treaty by testing a prohibited medium-range ground-launched cruise missile (presumably R-500, a modification of Iskander) and threatened to retaliate accordingly. Concern in the U.S. was also caused by the test-firing in 2014 of the Russian RS-26 Rubezh Intercontinental Ballistic Missile capable of evading the existing anti-ballistic missile defenses.

In early June 2015, the U.S. State Department reported that Russia had failed to correct the violation of the I.N.F. Treaty; the U.S. government was said to have made no discernible headway in making Russia so much as acknowledge the compliance problem.

==== Edward Snowden affair (2013) ====
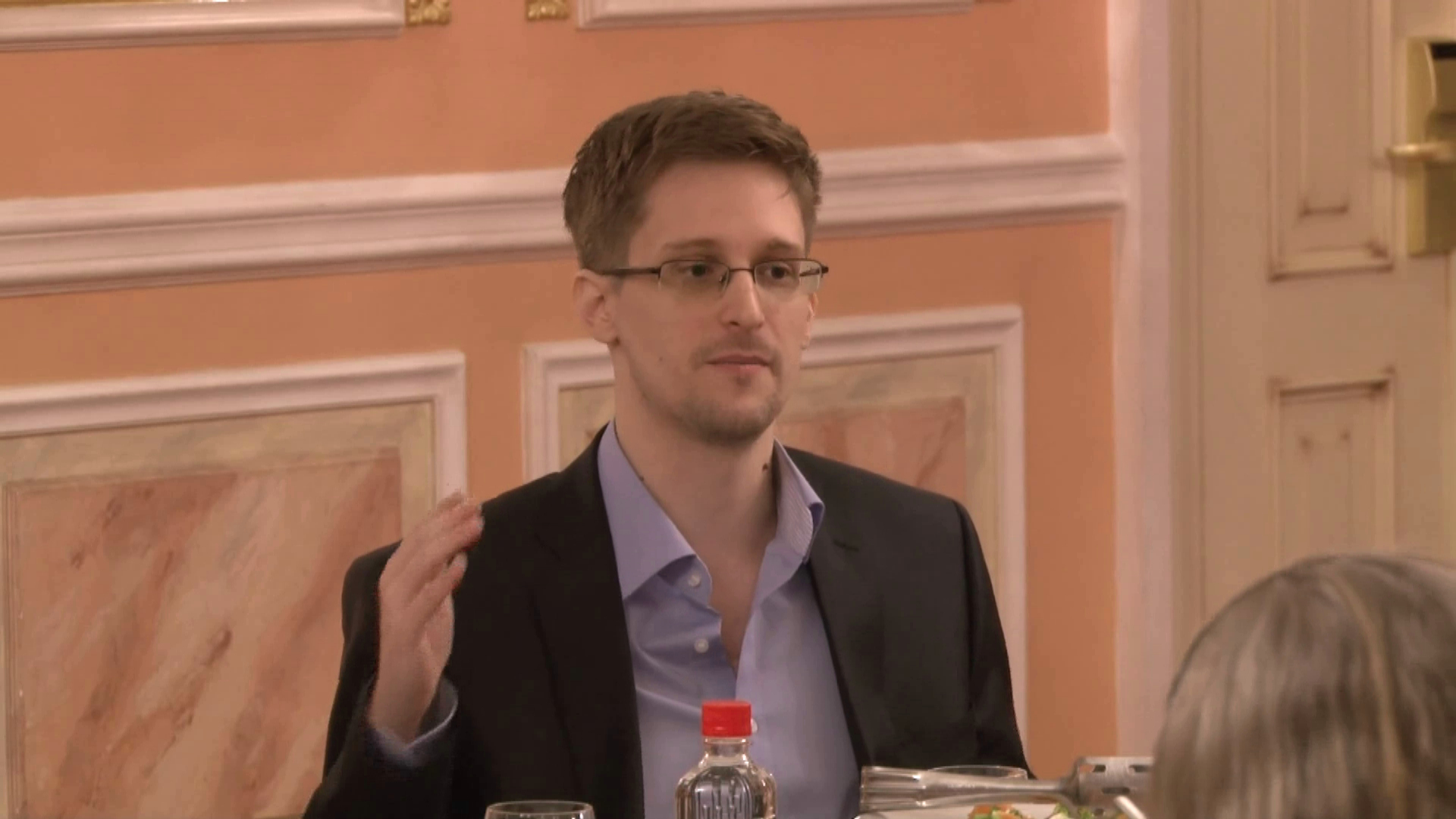
Snowden in Moscow in October 2013.

Edward Snowden, a contractor for the United States government, copied and released hundreds of thousands of pages of secret U.S. government documents. He fled to Hong Kong, and then to Russia where in July 2013 he was granted political asylum. He was wanted on a criminal warrant by U.S. prosecutors for theft of government property and espionage.

The granting of asylum further aggravated relations between the two countries and led to the cancellation of a meeting between Obama and Putin that was scheduled for early September 2013 in Moscow. Snowden remains in Russia as of October 2023.

==== Russian annexation of Crimea (2014) ====
Following the collapse of the Viktor Yanukovych government in Ukraine in February 2014, Russia annexed Crimea on the basis of a controversial referendum held on March 16, 2014. The U.S. had submitted a UN Security Council resolution declaring the referendum illegal; it was vetoed by Russia on March 15 with China abstaining and the other 13 Security Council members voting for the resolution. In 2016, in a court in Moscow, former top Ukrainian officials of the Yanukovich administration testified that the collapse of the government was, in their opinion, a coup d'état organized and sponsored by the U.S. government. Russian newspaper Kommersant alleges George Friedman (chairman of Stratfor) had agreed this was the "most blatant coup in history', which George Friedman says was taken out of context.

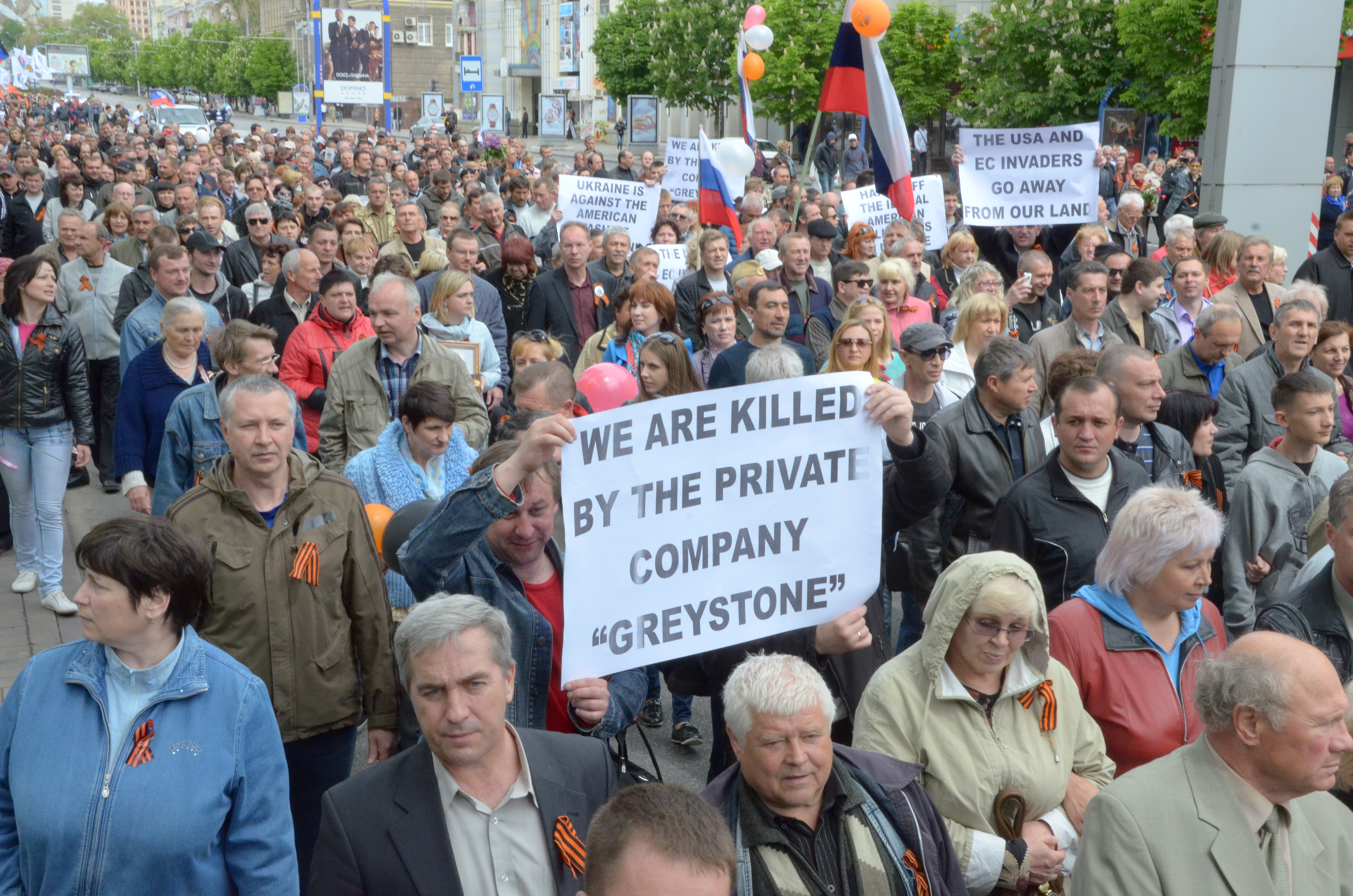
Anti-American slogans during the Victory Day celebrations in Donetsk, Russian-occupied Ukraine, May 9, 2014.

U.S. secretary of state John Kerry in early March 2014 answering the press questions about Russia's moves in Crimea said, "This is an act of aggression that is completely trumped up in terms of its pretext. It's really 19th century behavior in the 21st century, and there is no way, to start with, that if Russia persists in this, that the G8 countries are going to assemble in Sochi." On March 24, 2014, the U.S. and its allies in the G8 political forum suspended Russia's membership thereof. The decision was dismissed by Russia as inconsequential.

At the end of March 2014, U.S. president Obama ruled out any Western military intervention in Ukraine and admitted that Russia's annexation of Crimea would be hard to reverse; however, he dismissed Russia as a "regional power" that did not pose a major security threat to the U.S. In January 2016, when asked for his opinion of Obama's statement, Putin said, "I think that speculations about other countries, an attempt to speak disrespectfully about other countries is an attempt to prove one's exceptionalism by contrast. In my view, that is a misguided position."

As unrest spread into eastern Ukraine in the spring of 2014, relations between the U.S. and Russia further worsened. The U.S. government imposed punitive sanctions for Russia's activity in Ukraine. After one bout of sanctions announced by President Obama in July 2014 targeting Russia's major energy, financial and defence companies, Russia said the sanctions would seriously harm the bilateral ties relegating them to the 1980s Cold War era.

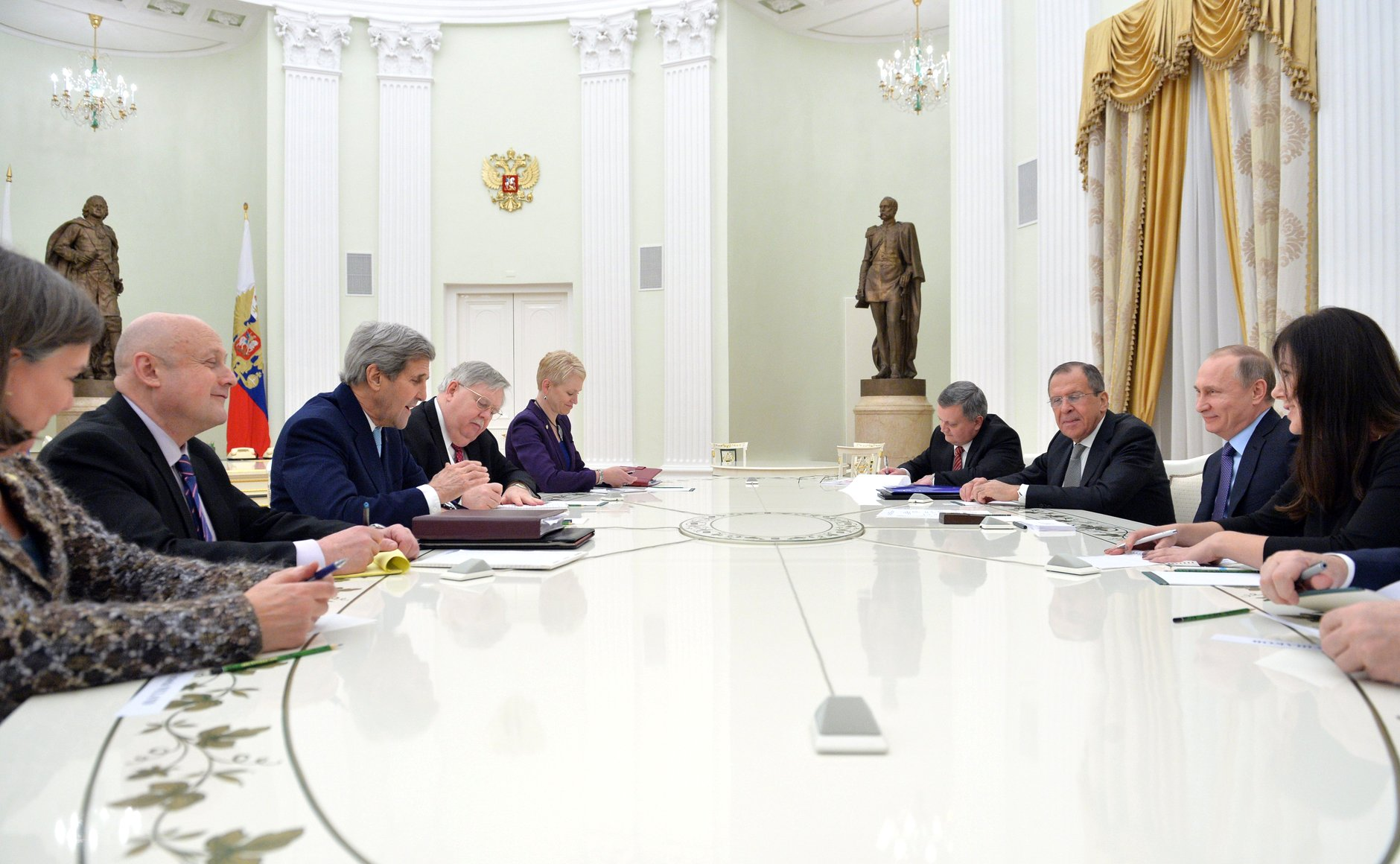
Putin meets with Secretary of State John Kerry, Victoria Nuland and John F. Tefft to discuss Ukraine and other issues in December 2015.

From March 2014 to 2016, six rounds of sanctions were imposed by the U.S., as well as by the EU, and some other countries allied to the U.S. The first three rounds targeted individuals close to Putin by freezing their assets and denying leave to enter. Russia responded by banning import of certain food products as well as by banning entry for certain government officials from the countries that imposed sanctions against Russia.

The end of 2014 saw the passage by the U.S. of the Ukraine Freedom Support Act of 2014, aimed at depriving certain Russian state firms of Western financing and technology while also providing $350 million in arms and military equipment to Ukraine, and the imposition by the U.S. president's executive order of yet another round of sanctions.

Due to the situation concerning Ukraine, relations between Russia and the U.S. that denounced Russia's actions were in 2014 said to be at their worst since the end of the Cold War.

As vice president, Joe Biden urged the Ukrainian government to reduce the nation's reliance on imports of Russian natural gas, and to eliminate pro-Russia middlemen such as Dmitry Firtash from the country's natural gas industry.

==== Russian military intervention in the Syrian Civil War (from September 30, 2015) ====
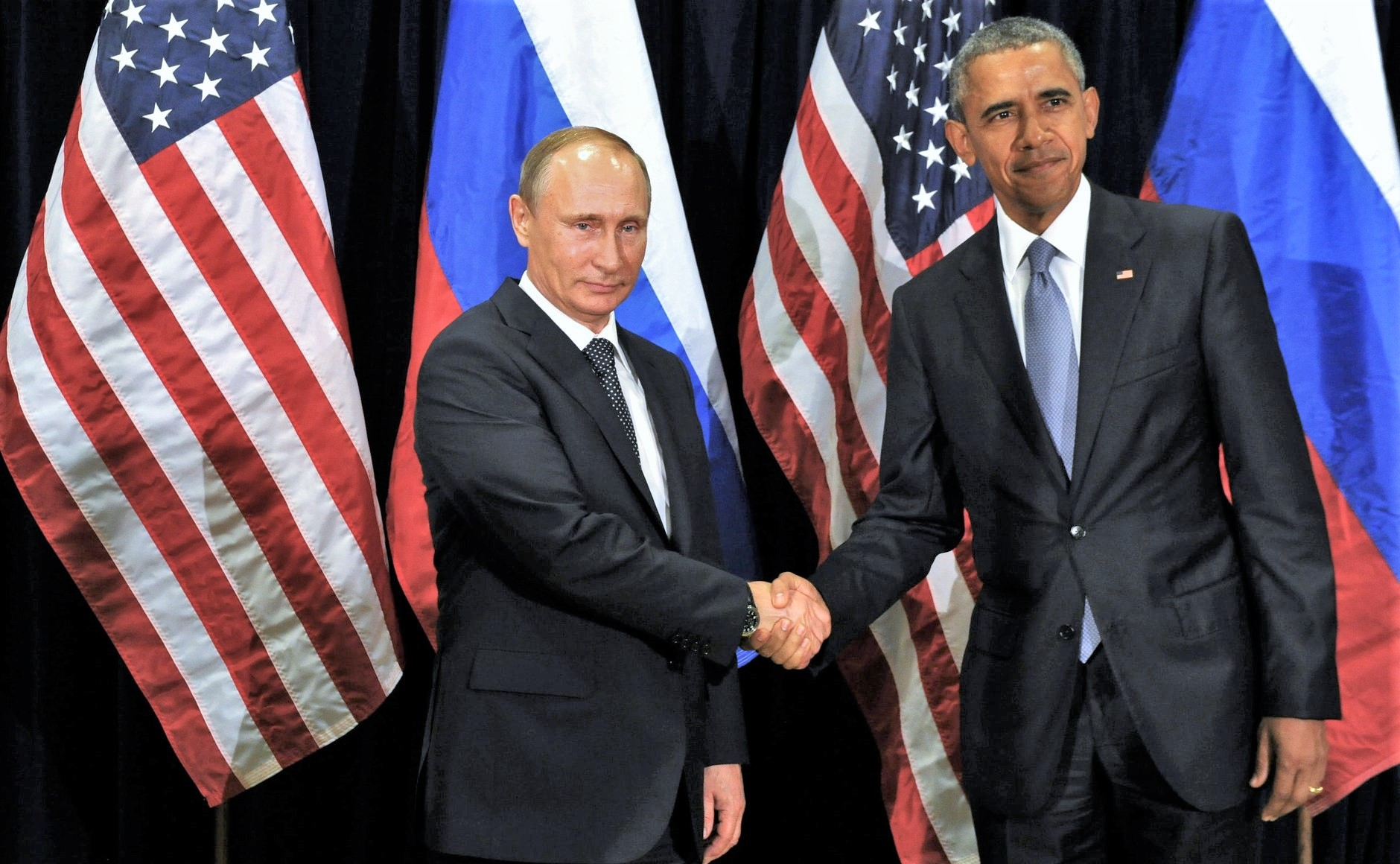
U.S. president Barack Obama and Russian president Vladimir Putin in New York City, September 2015

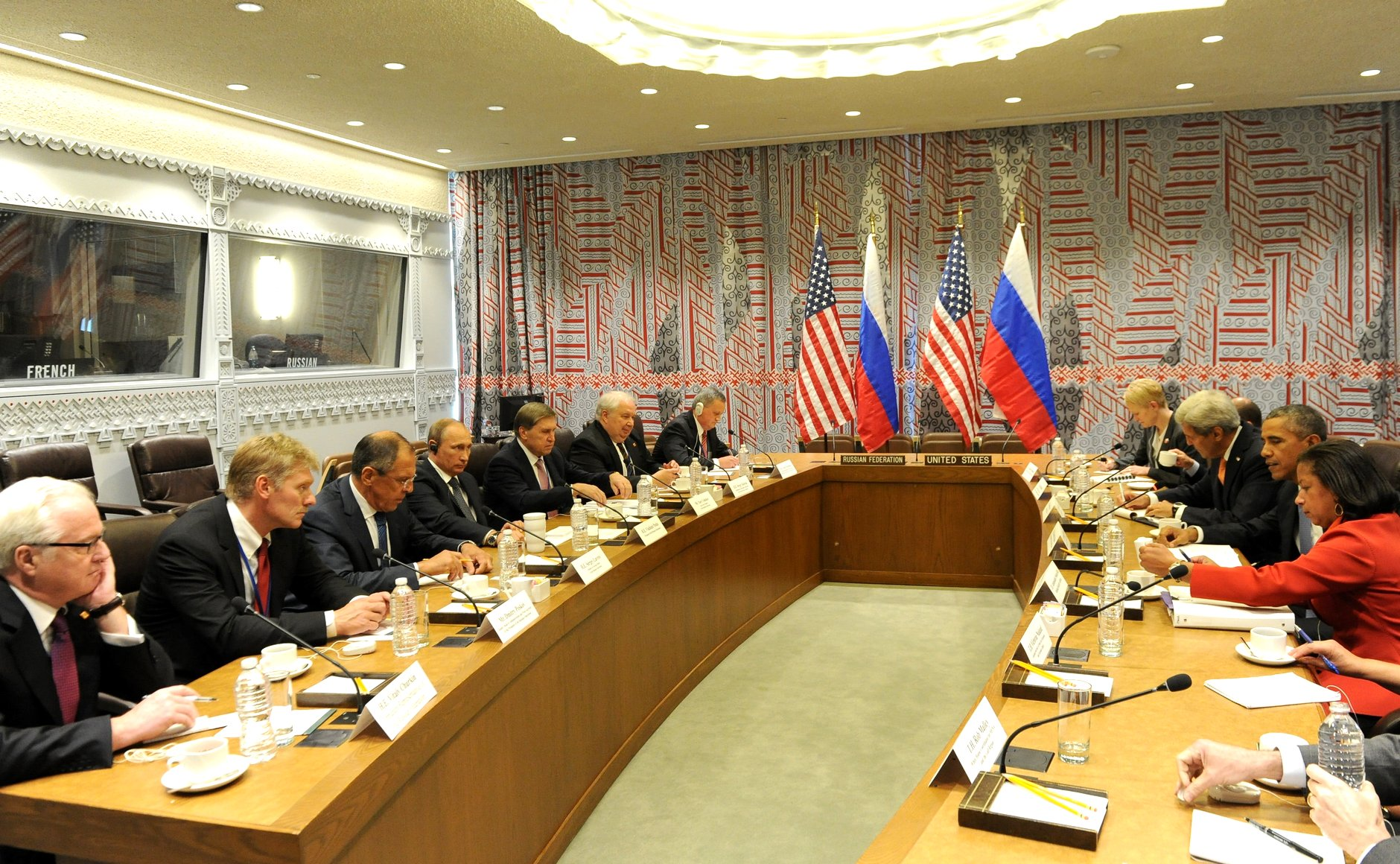
Barack Obama meets with Vladimir Putin to discuss Syria, September 29, 2015.

Shortly after the start of the Syrian Civil War in the spring of 2011, the U.S. imposed sanctions on Syria's government and urged President Bashar al-Assad to resign; meanwhile, Russia, a long-standing ally of Syria, continued and increased its support for the Syrian government against rebels backed up by the U.S. and its regional allies.

On September 30, 2015, Russia began the air campaign in Syria on the side of the Syrian government headed by President Bashar al-Assad of Syria. According to Russian foreign minister Sergey Lavrov's statement made in mid-October 2015, Russia had invited the U.S. to join the Baghdad-based information center set up by Iran, Iraq, Syria and Russia to coordinate their military efforts, but received what he called an "unconstructive" response; Putin's proposal that the U.S. receive a high-level Russian delegation and that a U.S. delegation arrive in Moscow to discuss co-operation in Syria was likewise declined by the U.S.

In early October 2015, U.S. president Obama called the way Russia was conducting its military campaign in Syria a "recipe for disaster"; top U.S. military officials ruled out military cooperation with Russia in Syria. Secretary of Defense Ashton Carter and other senior U.S. officials said Russia's campaign was primarily aimed at propping up Assad, whom U.S. president Barack Obama had repeatedly called upon to leave power.

Three weeks into the Russian campaign in Syria, on October 20, 2015, Russian president Vladimir Putin met Bashar al-Assad in Moscow to discuss their joint military campaign and a future political settlement in Syria, according to the Kremlin report of the event. The meeting provoked a sharp condemnation from the White House.

While one of the original aims of the Russian leadership may have been to normalize relations with the U.S. and the West at large, the resultant situation in Syria was said in October 2015 to be a proxy war between Russia and the U.S. The two rounds of the Syria peace talks held in Vienna in October and November 2015, with Iran participating for the first time, highlighted yet again the deep disagreement over the Syrian settlement between the U.S. and Russia, primarily on the issue of Bashar al-Assad's political future. The talks in Vienna were followed by a bilateral meeting of Obama and Putin on the sidelines of the G-20 Summit in Turkey, during which a certain consensus between the two leaders on Syria was reported to have been reached.

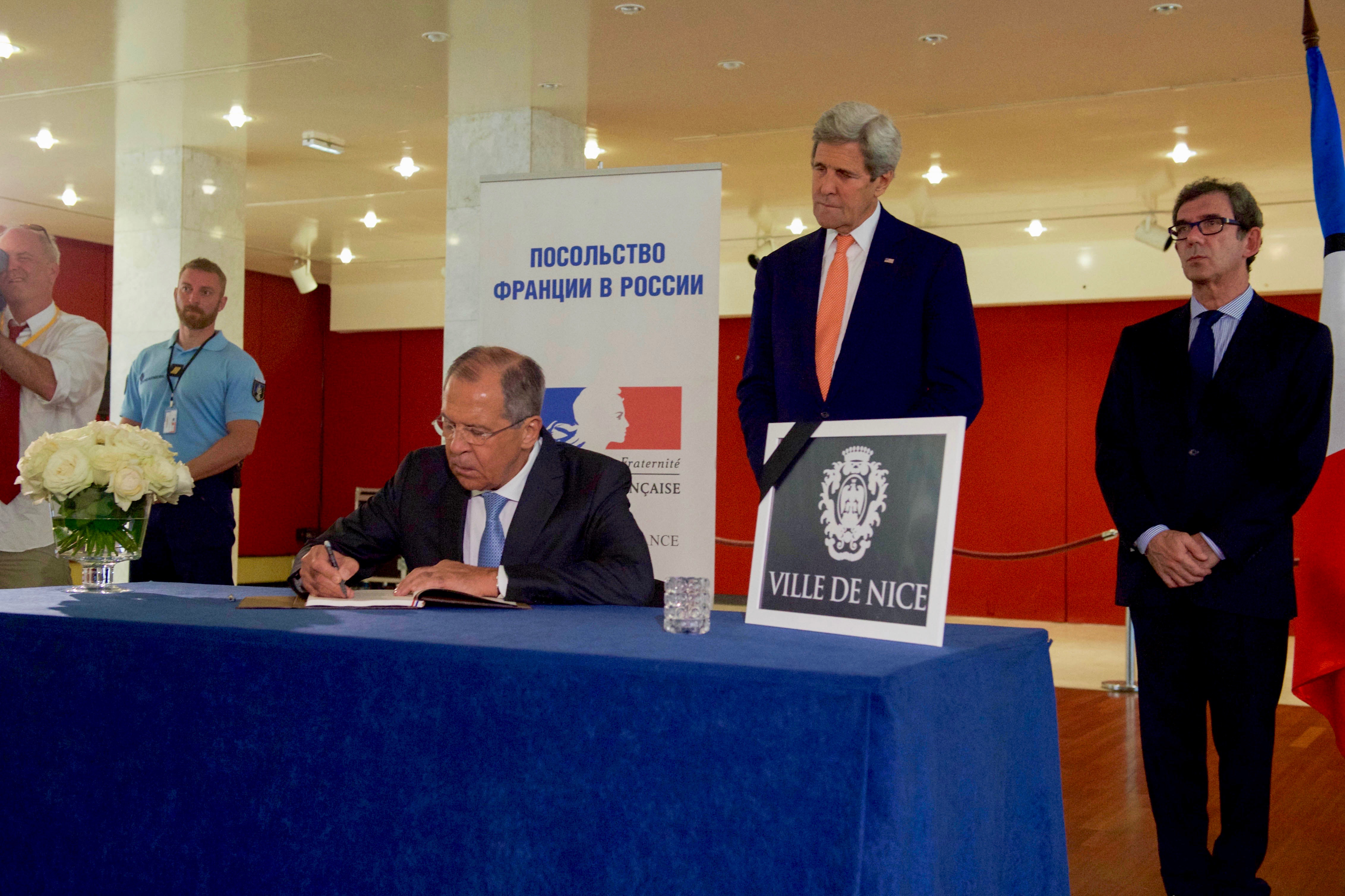
John Kerry and Sergey Lavrov are paying tribute at the French Embassy in Moscow after terror attack in Nice, July 15, 2016.

Bilateral negotiations over Syria were unilaterally suspended by the U.S. on October 3, 2016, which was presented as the U.S. government's reaction to a re-newed offensive on Aleppo by Syrian and Russian troops. On the same day Putin signed a decree that suspended the 2000 Plutonium Management and Disposition Agreement with the U.S. (the relevant law was signed on October 31, 2016), citing the failure by the U.S. to comply with the provisions thereof as well as the U.S.' unfriendly actions that posed a "threat to strategic stability."

In mid-October 2016, Russia's U.N. ambassador Vitaly Churkin, referring to the international situation during the 1973 Arab–Israeli War, said that tensions with the U.S. are "probably the worst since 1973". After two rounds of fruitless talks on Syria in Lausanne and London, the foreign ministers of the U.S. and the UK said that additional sanctions against both Russia and Syria were imminent unless Russia and the "Assad regime" stopped their air campaign in Aleppo.

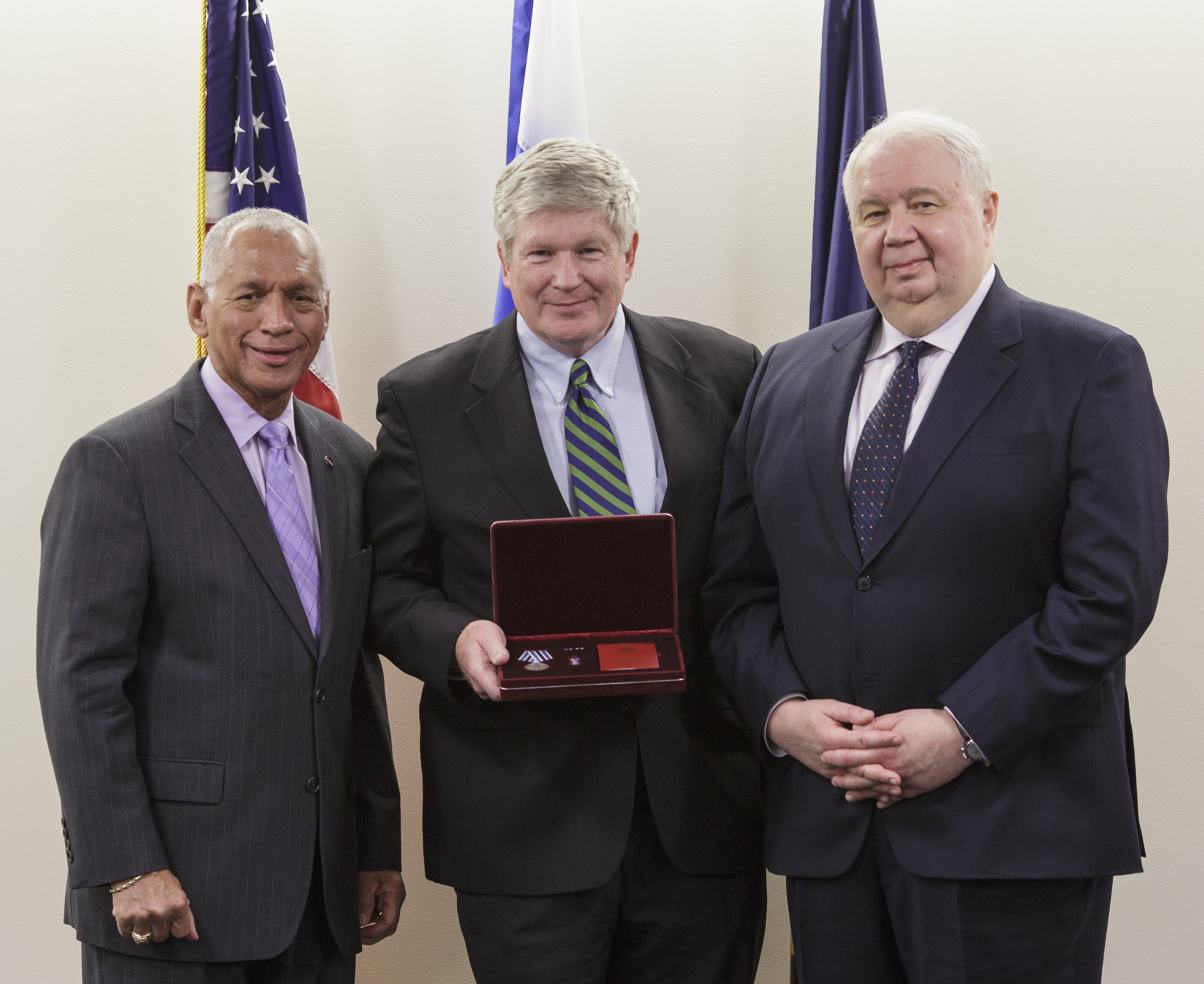
Russian ambassador Sergey Kislyak, NASA Administrator Charles Bolden and William Shepherd after Shepherd was awarded the Russian Medal "For Merit in Space Exploration", December 2, 2016.

=== First Trump administration (2017–2021) ===
==== Election of Donald Trump and Russian interference ====
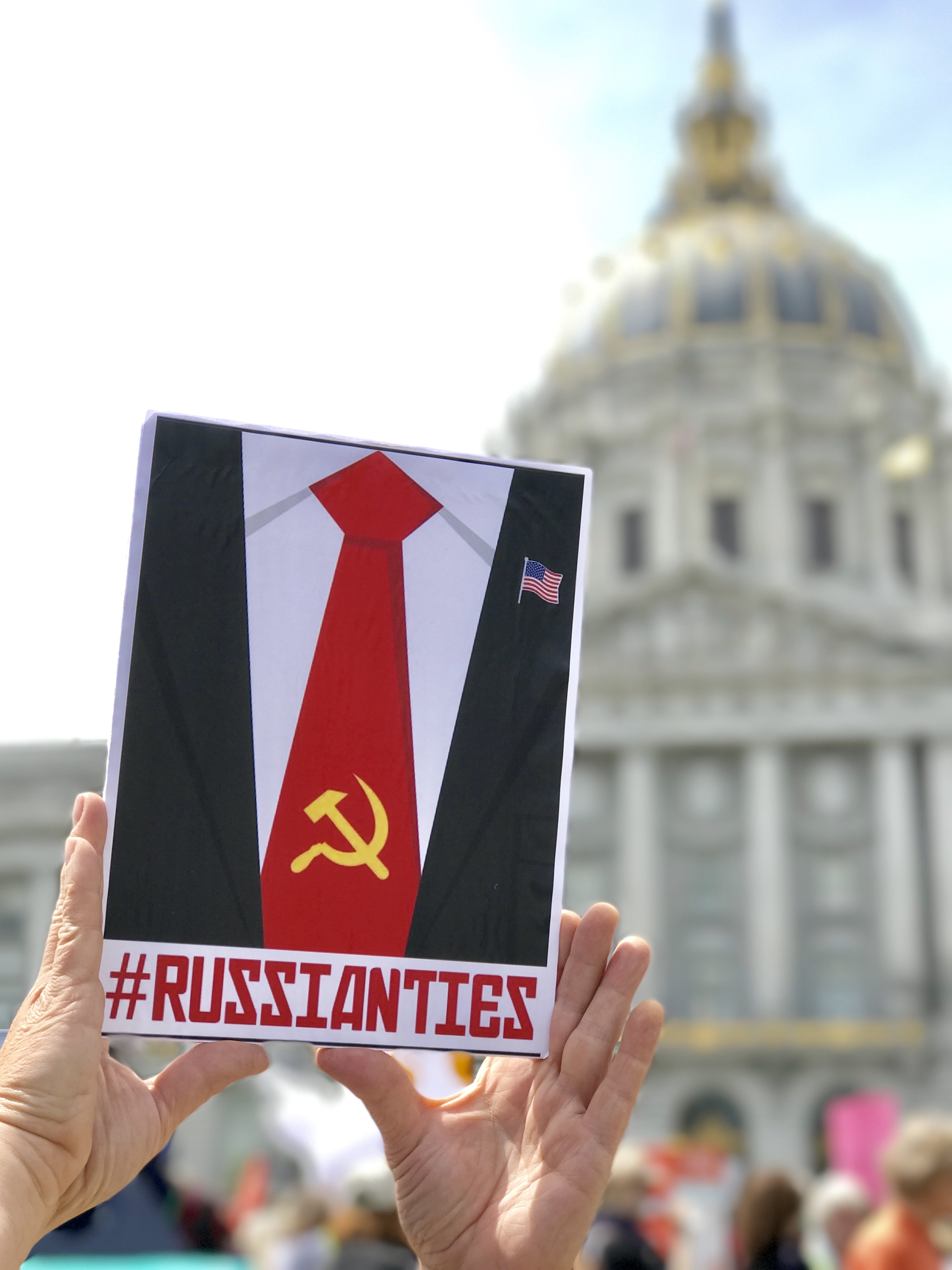
Anti-Trump poster in San Francisco, presumably associating Trump with Russia or the former Soviet Union, April 15, 2017.

In mid-November 2016, shortly after the election of Trump as the U.S. president, the Kremlin accused president Barack Obama's administration of trying to damage the U.S.' relationship with Russia to a degree that would render normalization thereof impossible for Trump's incoming administration.

In his address to the Russian parliament delivered on December 1, 2016, Russian president Putin said this of U.S.—Russia relations: "We are prepared to cooperate with the new American administration. It's important to normalize and begin to develop bilateral relations on an equal and mutually beneficial basis. Mutual efforts by Russia and the United States in solving global and regional problems are in the interest of the entire world."

In early December 2016, the White House said that President Obama had ordered the intelligence agencies to review evidence of Russian interference in the 2016 presidential campaign; Eric Schultz, the deputy White House press secretary, denied the review to be led by Director of National Intelligence James R. Clapper was meant to be "an effort to challenge the outcome of the election". Simultaneously, the U.S. press published reports, with reference to senior administration officials, that U.S. intelligence agencies, specifically the CIA, had concluded with "high confidence" that Russia acted covertly in the latter stages of the presidential campaign to harm Hillary Clinton's chances and promote Donald Trump. President-elect Donald Trump rejected the CIA assessment that Russia was behind the hackers' efforts to sway the campaign in his favour as "ridiculous".

In mid-December 2016, Hillary Clinton suggested that Putin had a personal grudge against her due to her criticism of the 2011 Russian legislative election and his opinion that she was responsible for fomenting the anti-Putin protests in Russia that began in December 2011. She partially attributed her loss in the 2016 election to Russian meddling organized by Putin. However, the founder of WikiLeaks, Julian Assange, has repeatedly denied that Russia was involved in the hack of the emails from the Clinton campaign.

Also in mid-December, President Obama publicly pledged to retaliate for Russian cyberattacks during the U.S. presidential election in order to "send a clear message to Russia" as both a punishment and a deterrent; however, the press reported that his actionable options were limited, with many of those having been rejected as either ineffective or too risky. The New York Times, citing a catalogue of U.S.-engineered coups in foreign countries, opined, "There is not much new in tampering with elections, except for the technical sophistication of the tools. For all the outrage voiced by Democrats and Republicans in the past week about the Russian action — with the notable exception of Mr. Trump, who has dismissed the intelligence findings as politically motivated — it is worth remembering that trying to manipulate elections is a well-honed American art form."

The National Defense Authorization Act for Fiscal Year 2017 signed into law by President Obama on December 23, 2016, was criticised by the Russian foreign ministry as yet another attempt to "create problems for the incoming Trump administration and complicate its relations on the international stage, as well as to force it to adopt an anti-Russia policy."

At the end of 2016, U.S. president-elect Donald Trump praised Putin for not expelling U.S. diplomats in response to Washington's expulsion of 35 Russian diplomats as well as other punitive measures taken by the Obama administration in retaliation for what U.S. officials had characterized as interference in the U.S. presidential election.

On January 6, 2017, the Office of the Director of National Intelligence (ODNI), in an assessment of "Russian Activities and Intentions in Recent U.S. Elections", asserted that Russian leadership favored presidential candidate Trump over Clinton, and that Putin personally ordered an "influence campaign" to harm Clinton's chances and "undermine public faith in the US democratic process". Trump campaign manager Paul Manafort admitted he was in contact with Russian operatives and sharing information through the campaign.

==== 2017 ====
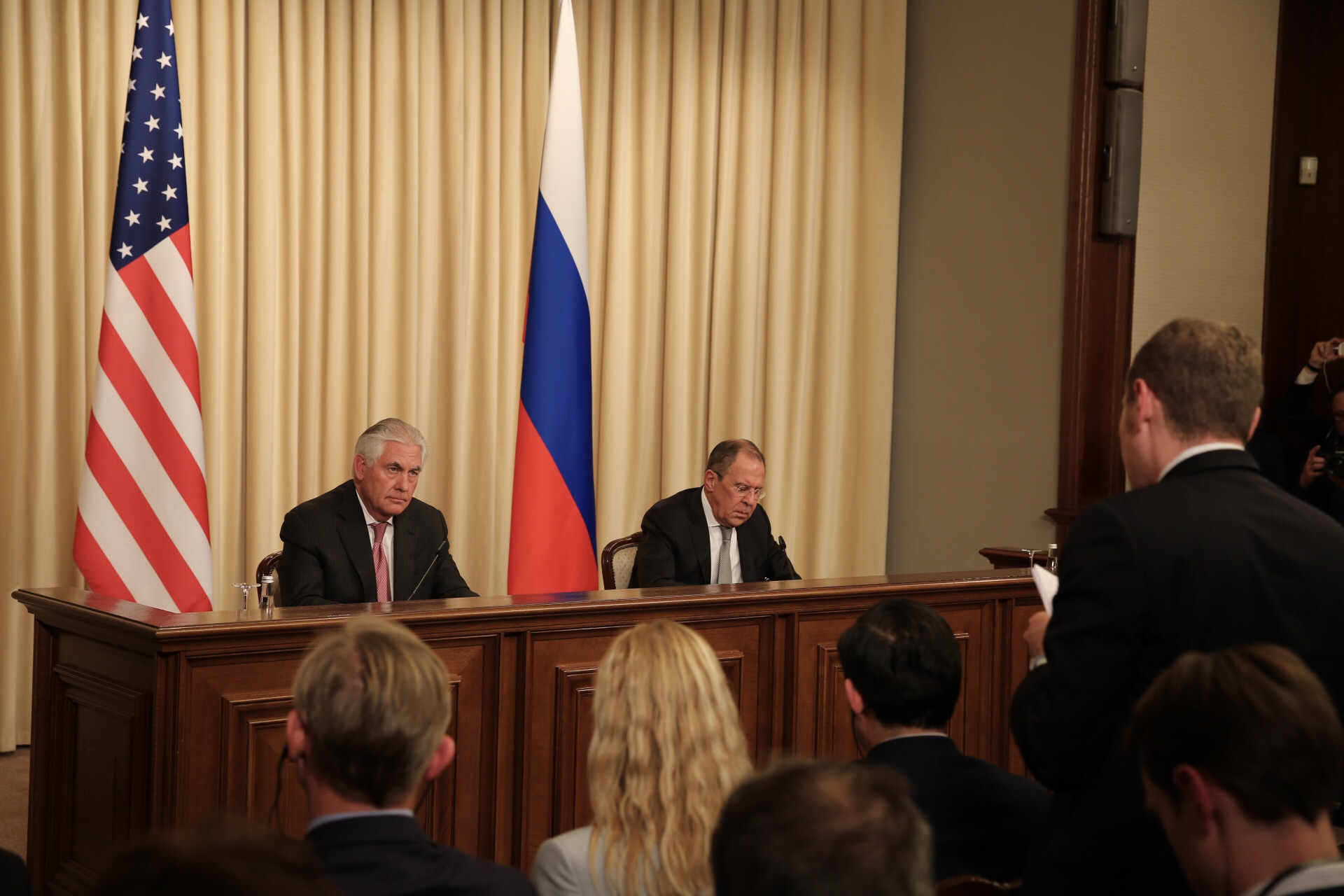
Secretary of State Rex Tillerson with Russian foreign minister Sergey Lavrov in Moscow, Russia, April 12, 2017.

A week after Trump's inauguration on January 20, 2017, Trump had a 52-minute telephone conversation with Russian president Vladimir Putin that was hailed by both governments as a step towards improvement of relations between the U.S. and Russia; the presidents agreed to arrange a face-to-face meeting for a later date.

In early March 2017, the U.S. military for the first time publicly accused Russia of having deployed a land-based cruise missile (SSC-8) that they said violated the "spirit and intent" of the 1987 Intermediate-range Nuclear Forces (INF) treaty and posed a threat to NATO.

On March 25, 2017, the U.S. imposed new sanctions against eight Russian companies in connection with the Iran, North Korea, Syria Nonproliferation Act (INKSNA).

The cruise-missile strikes on the Syrian Shayrat Airbase, conducted by the U.S. on April 7, 2017, as a response to the Khan Shaykhun chemical attack, were condemned by Russia as an "act of aggression" that was based on a "trumped-up pretext", which substantially impaired Russia–United States relations. Russian prime minister Dmitry Medvedev said the attack had placed the U.S. on the cusp of warfare with Russia. Both Donald Trump in April and the Russian government in May characterised the relationship between the countries as frozen and lacking any progress; in early June, Vladimir Putin said relations were at an all-time low since the end of the Cold War. In mid-June 2017, the Russian foreign ministry confirmed that, for the first time ever, Russia had failed to receive a formal greeting from the U.S. government on occasion of Russia's national day celebrated on June 12.

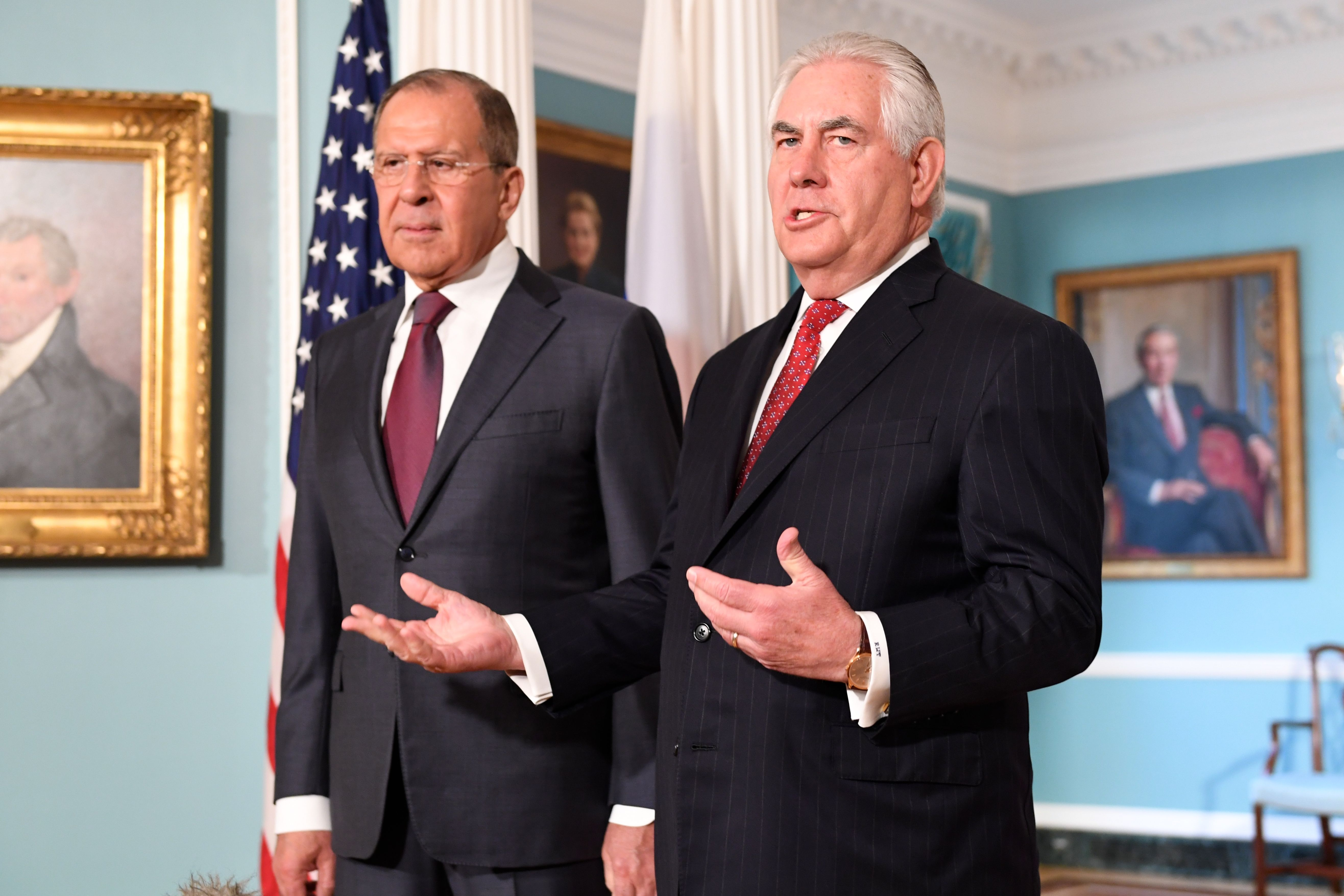
U.S. secretary of state Rex Tillerson and Russian foreign minister Sergey Lavrov in Washington, D.C., May 10, 2017.

In April 2017, Trump's administration denied a request from ExxonMobil to allow it to resume oil drilling in Russia. In July 2017, ExxonMobil filed a lawsuit against the U.S. government challenging the finding that the company violated sanctions imposed on Russia.

On May 10, 2017, Trump had an unannounced meeting in the Oval Office with Russian foreign minister Sergey Lavrov and Russian ambassador to the United States Sergey Kislyak. During the meeting he disclosed highly classified information, providing details that could have been used to deduce the source of the information and the manner in which it was collected, according to current and former government officials. Although the disclosure was not illegal, it was widely criticized because of the possible danger to the source.

On July 6, 2017, during a speech in Warsaw, Poland, Trump urged Russia to cease its support for "hostile regimes" in Syria and Iran. On July 7, 2017, in what appeared to be a sign of good relations between the leaders of both countries, Trump met with Putin at the G20 Hamburg summit in Germany and described the meeting as "an honour."

In mid-July 2017, the Russian foreign ministry noted that the staff of the U.S. Embassy in Moscow, following expulsion of diplomats by the Obama administration in December 2016, far exceeded the number of Russian embassy employees in Washington and indicated that the Russian government was considering retaliatory expulsion of more than thirty-five U.S. diplomats, thus evening out the number of the countries' diplomats posted. On July 28, Russia announced punitive measures that were cast as Russia's response to the additional, codified, sanctions against Moscow passed by Congress days prior, but also referenced the specific measures imposed against the Russian diplomatic mission in the U.S. by the Obama administration. Russia demanded that the U.S. reduce its diplomatic and technical personnel in the Moscow embassy and its consulates in St Petersburg, Ekaterinburg and Vladivostok to four hundred fifty-five persons — the same as the number of Russian diplomats posted in the U.S. — by September 1; Russia's government would also suspend the use of a retreat compound and a storage facility in Moscow used by the U.S. by August 1. Two days later, Vladimir Putin said that the decision on the curtailment of the U.S. diplomatic mission personnel had been taken by him personally and that 755 staff must terminate their work in Russia. After the sanction bill was on August 2 signed by Donald Trump, Russian prime minister Dmitry Medvedev wrote that the law had ended hope for improving U.S.–Russia relations and meant "an all-out trade war with Russia." The law was also criticised by Donald Trump, whose signing statement indicated that he might choose not to enforce certain provisions of the legislation that he deemed unconstitutional.

Russia protested on September 2, 2017, against a search it said U.S. officials were planning of a Russian trade mission building in Washington D.C., shortly after the U.S., "in the spirit of parity invoked by the Russians", demanded that Russia shut two of its diplomatic annexes (buildings) in Washington D.C. and New York City as well as its Consulate General in San Francisco. The Russian foreign ministry said the inspection would be "illegal" and an "unprecedented aggressive action"; it also demanded that the U.S. ″immediately return the Russian diplomatic facilities″.

In November 2017, Trump and Putin both attended the Asia-Pacific Economic Cooperation meeting in Danang. Although they had no formal meeting they spoke informally several times during the event.

At the end of 2017, CNN concluded that a series of steps undertaken by the first Trump administration within a mere week before Christmas such as naming Russia a "rival power" and ″revisionist power″ (along with China), imposing sanctions on Ramzan Kadyrov, a close Putin ally, the decision to provide Ukraine with anti-tank weapons, coupled with tougher line from the State Department about Moscow's activities in eastern Ukraine, and accusations from the Pentagon that Russia was intentionally violating de-confliction agreements in Syria, highlighted "a decided turn away from the warmer, more cooperative relationship with Russia that President Donald Trump called for during his campaign and early in his presidency". In February 2018, echoing Donald Trump's own statement, White House press secretary Sarah Huckabee Sanders said: "[President Donald Trump] has been tougher on Russia in the first year than Obama was in eight years combined."

==== Beginning of Putin's fourth term (2018–2020) ====
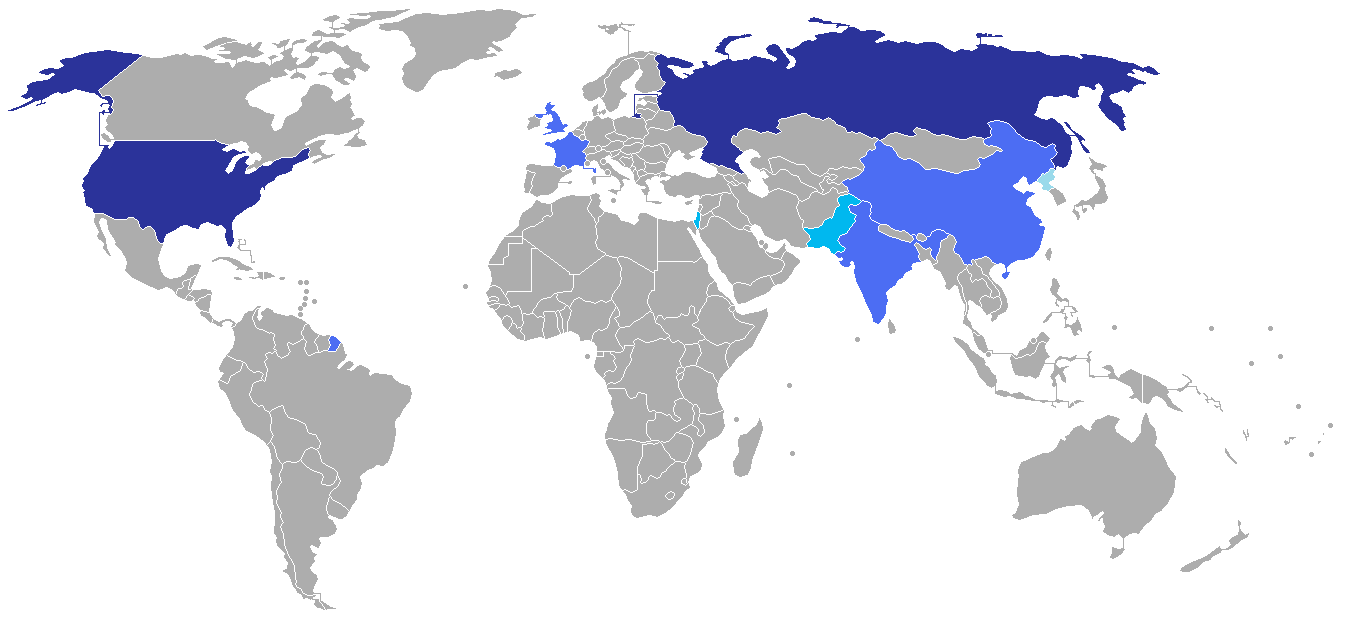
Large nuclear weapons stockpile with global range (dark blue), smaller stockpile with global range (medium blue).

A highly unusual unannounced visit to Washington, D.C., at the end of January 2018 by the directors of Russia's three main intelligence and security agencies (FSB, SVR, and GRU), two of whom (Sergey Naryshkin and Igor Korobov) were on the U.S. sanctions list, and their reported meetings with top U.S. security officials caused political controversy in the U.S. and elicited no official comment in Russia, while it occurred days before the first Trump administration chose not to impose immediately new sanctions on Russia at the deadline mandated by the Countering America's Adversaries Through Sanctions Act.

The U.S. air and artillery strike on a pro-government formation in eastern Syria on February 7, 2018, which caused massive death toll among Russian nationals and a political scandal in Russia, was billed by media as "the first deadly clash between citizens of Russia and the United States since the Cold War" and "an episode that threatens to deepen tensions with Moscow".

Public statements read out by Vladimir Putin on March 1, 2018, days before the presidential election, about missile technology breakthroughs made by Russia, were referred to by first Trump administration officials as largely boastful untruths, as well as confirmation that "Russia ha[d] been developing destabilizing weapons systems for over a decade, in direct violation of its treaty obligations". U.S. Defense Secretary James Mattis remarked that the systems Putin had talked about "[were] still years away" and he did not see them changing the military balance. Nevertheless, White House insiders were later quoted as saying that Putin's claims "really got under the president [Trump]'s skin" and caused Trump to take a sharper tone behind the scenes vis-à-vis Vladimir Putin.

On March 26, 2018, following the United States National Security Council's recommendation, to demonstrate the U.S.'s support for the UK's position on the Salisbury poisoning incident, President Donald Trump ordered the expulsion of sixty Russian diplomats and closure of Russian consulate in Seattle. Russian foreign minister Sergei Lavrov responded to the simultaneous expulsion of the total of 140 Russian diplomats by 25 countries by accusing the U.S. government of "blackmailing" other nations.

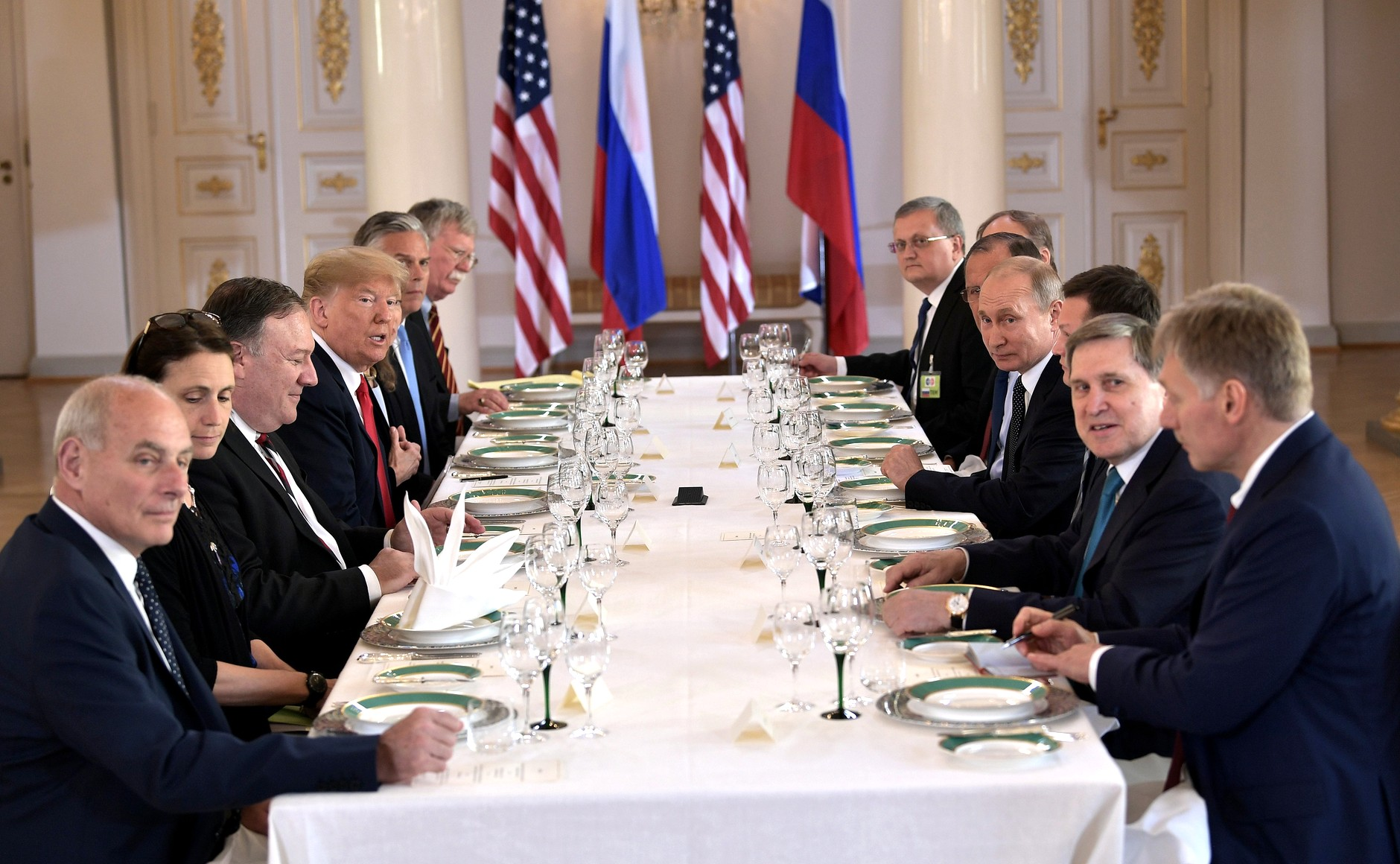
Talks between U.S. delegation headed by Trump and Russian delegation headed by Vladimir Putin at the summit in Helsinki, Finland July 16, 2018.

In April 2018, U.S.–Russian relations were further exacerbated by missile strikes against the Syrian government targets following the suspected chemical attack in Douma on April 7. The countries clashed diplomatically, with Russia's top military officials threatening to hit U.S. military targets in the event of a massive U.S.-led strike against Syria. In late May, during an interview with RT, Syria's president Bashar al-Assad said that direct military conflict between the Russian forces and the U.S. forces in Syria had been averted in April "by the wisdom of the Russian leadership" and that the U.S.-led missile attack against Syria would have been far more extensive had it not been for Russia's intervention.

On June 8, 2018, Trump called for Russia to be readmitted to the G-7, from which it was expelled after the Russian annexation of Crimea in 2014.

Trump's public statements during his first formal meeting with Putin in Helsinki on July 16, 2018, drew criticism from the Democratic members of the U.S. Congress and a number of former senior intelligence officials as well as some ranking members of the Republican party for appearing to have sided with Putin rather than accepting the findings of Russian interference in the 2016 presidential election issued by the United States Intelligence Community. Republican senator John McCain called the press conference "one of the most disgraceful performances by an American president in memory." The press around the world ran publications that tended to assess the news conference following the presidents′ two-hour meeting as an event at which Trump had "projected weakness".

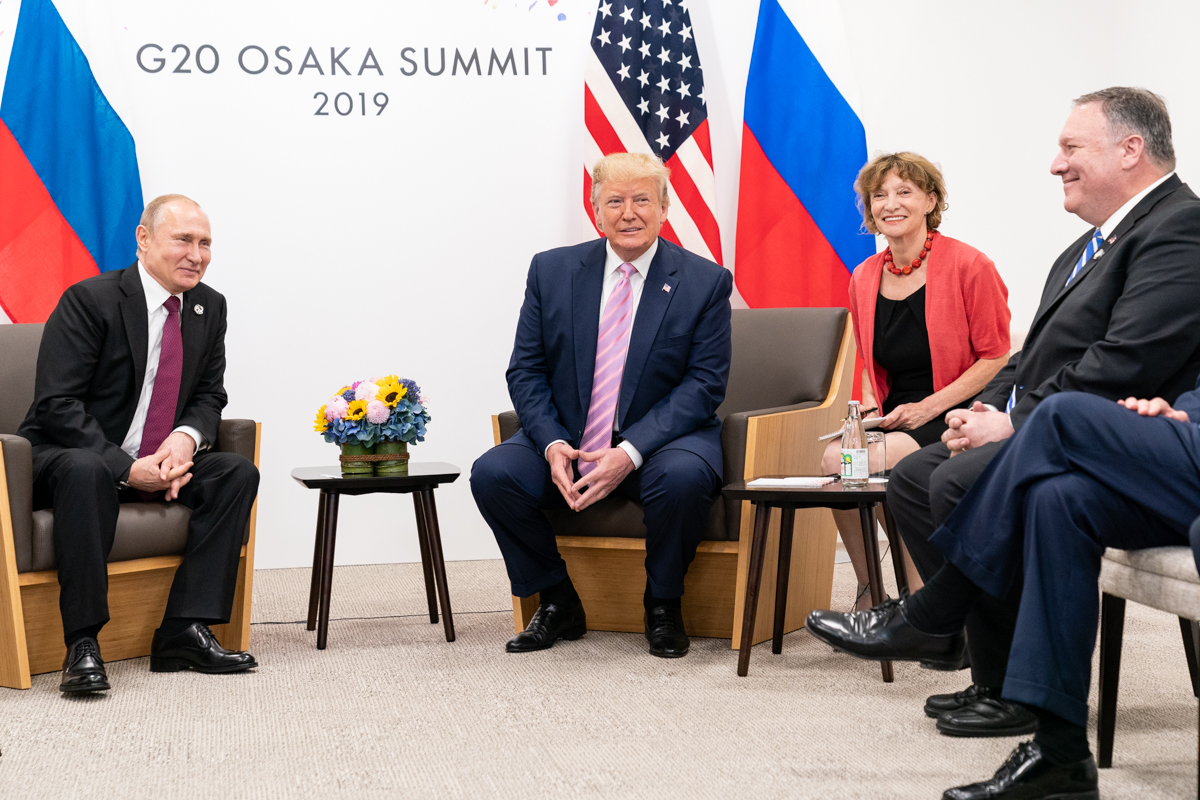
Donald Trump (center), U.S. secretary of state Mike Pompeo and Russian president Vladimir Putin (left) meet in Osaka, Japan, in June 2019.

In December 2019, the first Trump administration imposed sanctions on businesses involved in the construction of Nord Stream 2 natural gas pipeline from Russia to Germany, as the U.S. sought to sell more of its own liquefied natural gas (LNG) to European states. German Finance Minister Olaf Scholz called the sanctions "a severe intervention in German and European internal affairs", while the EU spokesman criticized "the imposition of sanctions against EU companies conducting legitimate business." Russian foreign minister Sergey Lavrov also criticized sanctions, saying that U.S. Congress "is literally overwhelmed with the desire to do everything to destroy" the U.S.–Russia relations.

A June 2020 New York Times report, citing unnamed sources, stated that American intelligence officials assessed with medium confidence that Russian military intelligence unit 29155 had supervised a bounty program paying Taliban-linked militants to kill foreign servicemembers, including Americans, in Afghanistan in 2019. The bounty program reportedly resulted in the deaths of "several" U.S. soldiers. The Pentagon's top leaders said that the Russian bounty program could not be corroborated. The Taliban and Russia have both denied that the bounty program exists. President Donald Trump and his aides denied that he was briefed on the intelligence. Director of National Intelligence John Ratcliffe said that Trump had not received a briefing on the bounty program. White House press secretary Kayleigh McEnany said the same. Secretary of Defense Mark Esper said that General Kenneth McKenzie, the commander of U.S. Central Command, and General Scott Miller, the top U.S. military commander in Afghanistan, did not think "the reports were credible as they dug into them." McKenzie said that he found no "causative link" between reported bounties to actual U.S. military deaths, but said a lack of proof is "often true in battlefield intelligence."

On July 1, 2020, following media reports of Taliban participation in an alleged Russian bounty program, the U.S. House Armed Services Committee overwhelmingly voted in favor of an amendment to restrict President Trump's ability to withdraw U.S. troops from Afghanistan.

On September 25, 2020, U.S. Air Force B-52 bombers staged a mock attack run on Kaliningrad, a Russian exclave locked between NATO countries. The simulated raid on the Kaliningrad region was a test case of destroying Russian air defense systems located in the region.

==== Influence on the Trump administrations ====
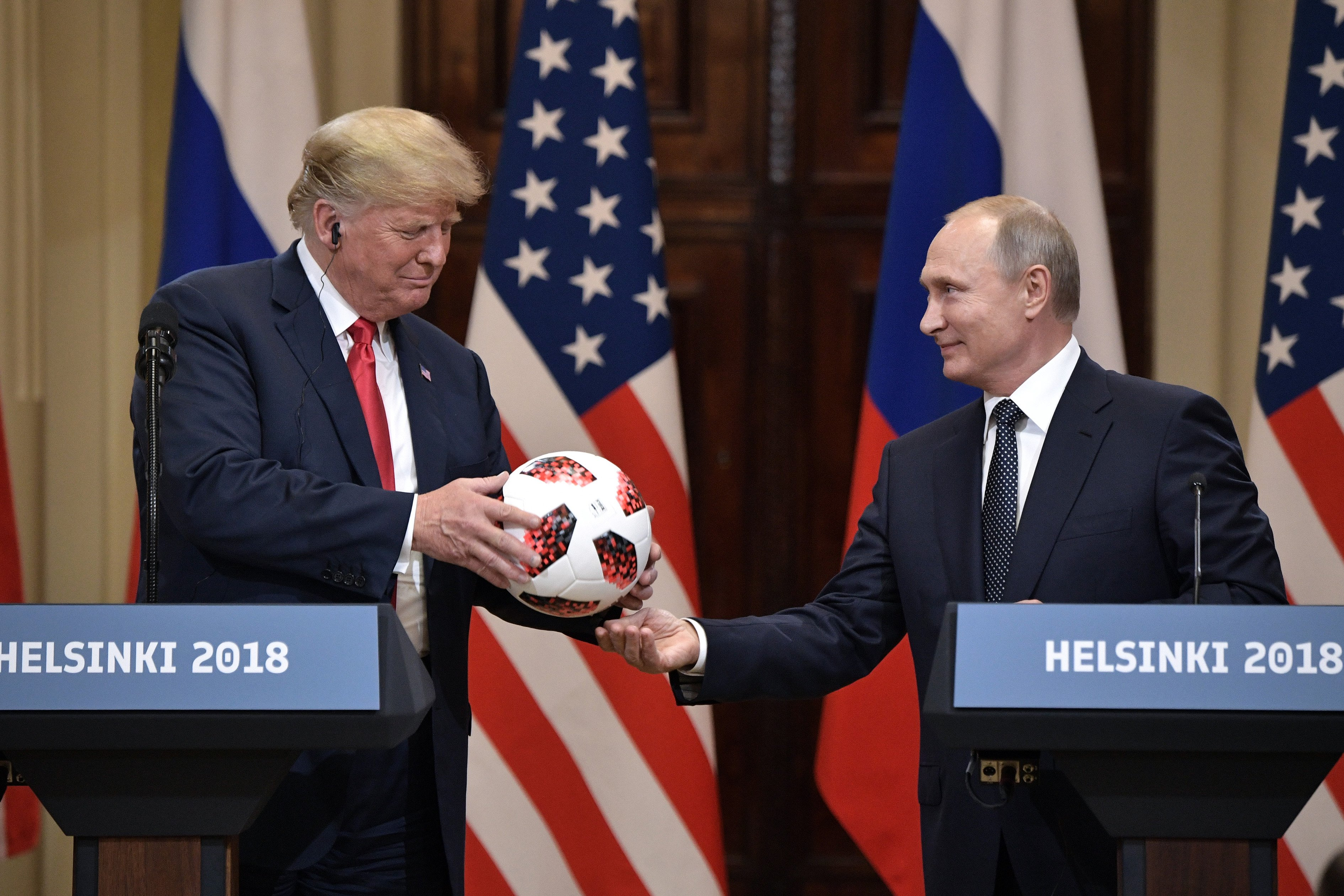
The 2018 Helsinki summit. Putin gifts Trump a Telstar Mechta, the official match ball for the knockout stage of the 2018 FIFA World Cup.

Shortly before the inauguration of President Trump, the Steele dossier was leaked to the public. Written by a private intelligence firm claiming to unearth a relationship between his presidential campaign and the Russian government, the report alleged that the Russians possessed kompromat on Trump which could be used to blackmail him. It suggested the Kremlin had promised the campaign that compromising information would not be released if the Administration cooperated. Though the report was met with skepticism, the relationship between Russian leadership and the incoming first Trump Administration became highly salient. Days later, Ynet, an Israeli online news site, reported that U.S. intelligence had advised Israeli intelligence officers to be cautious about sharing information with the incoming first Trump administration until the possibility of Russian influence over Trump had been fully investigated. Allegations of collusion between Trump associations and the Russian government continued to emerge well into his presidency.

Various links between Trump associates and Russian officials have been documented and heavily scrutinized, most notably former National Security Advisor Michael Flynn's contacts with the Russian ambassador. Throughout his presidential tenure, Trump expressed both support and criticism of Russia's actions in Crimea, Syria, Ukraine, North Korea, Venezuela, election meddling, Skripal poisoning, and oil drilling in Russia.

In spite of a halting of the FBI's efforts to corroborate the Steele dossier's allegations, some progress has been made, so the corroboration status of its allegations has changed with time as more information has come forth. Some allegations have been publicly corroborated, while some others are plausible but not specifically confirmed, and yet others are dubious in retrospect but not strictly disproven. (Note: The corroboration status of the Steele dossier's allegations has changed with time as more information has come forth. After a slow progression in the winter and spring of 2017, the FBI stopped all efforts to corroborate the dossier in May 2017 when Mueller's Special Counsel Office (SCO) took over the Russia investigation: "FBI had begun efforts to corroborate accusations within the dossier in the fall of 2016, an effort that progressed slowly through the winter and into the spring of 2017. When the SCO began work in May 2017, however, all those efforts ceased at FBI."; "On standup of the SCO, the Committee lost access to all relevant information regarding FBI's efforts to verify the dossier, as it did with all information the SCO declared to touch its 'equities'."; "FBI also made efforts to corroborate the information in the dossier memos, but the Committee found that attempt lacking in both thoroughness and rigor. The FBI pursued FISA coverage of Carter Page in October 2016, including information from the dossier, but at the time it had very little information on Steele's subsources or corroboration of Steele's information."; "[In May 2017,] the SCO began its work and FBI halted efforts on the dossier."; Corroboration status: While the dossier played a significant role in initially highlighting the general friendliness between Trump and the Putin administration, the corroboration status of specific allegations is highly variable. Some allegations have been publicly corroborated, while some others are plausible but not specifically confirmed, and yet others are dubious in retrospect but not strictly disproven. The following allegations have been publicly corroborated by U.S. intelligence agencies, the January 2017 ODNI report, and the Mueller report: "The Russian government was working to get Mr. Trump elected." (Note: In 2019, Matthew Rosenberg wrote: "Parts of the dossier have proved prescient. Its main assertion – that the Russian government was working to get Mr. Trump elected – was hardly an established fact when it was first laid out by Mr. Steele in June 2016. But it has since been backed up by the United States' own intelligence agencies – and Mr. Mueller's investigation. The dossier's talk of Russian efforts to cultivate some people in Mr. Trump's orbit was similarly unknown when first detailed in one of Mr. Steele's reports, but it has proved broadly accurate as well."); Russia sought "to cultivate people in Trump's orbit".; Trump campaign officials and associates had secretive contacts with Russian officials and agents.; Putin favored Trump over Hillary Clinton.; Putin personally ordered an "influence campaign" to harm Clinton's campaign and to "undermine public faith in the US democratic process".; Putin ordered cyberattacks on both parties.; Some other allegations are plausible but not specifically confirmed, and some are dubious in retrospect but not strictly disproven.) Some have described the allegations as part of a conspiracy theory. (Note: Multiple sources:)

Trump's actions at the Helsinki summit in 2018 led some to conclude that Steele's report was more accurate than not. Politico reported, "Trump sided with the Russians over the U.S. intelligence community's assessment that Moscow had waged an all-out attack on the 2016 election...The joint news conference cemented fears among some that Trump was in Putin's pocket and prompted bipartisan backlash." At the joint news conference, when asked directly about the subject, Putin denied that he had any kompromat on Trump. Trump was reportedly given a gift from Putin the weekend of the pageant, though Putin argued "that he did not even know Trump was in Russia for the Miss Universe pageant in 2013 when, according to the Steele dossier, video of Trump was secretly recorded to blackmail him."

In reaction to Trump's actions at the summit, Senator Chuck Schumer (D-N.Y.) spoke in the Senate:

Millions of Americans will continue to wonder if the only possible explanation for this dangerous and inexplicable behavior is the possibility — the very real possibility — that President Putin holds damaging information over President Trump.

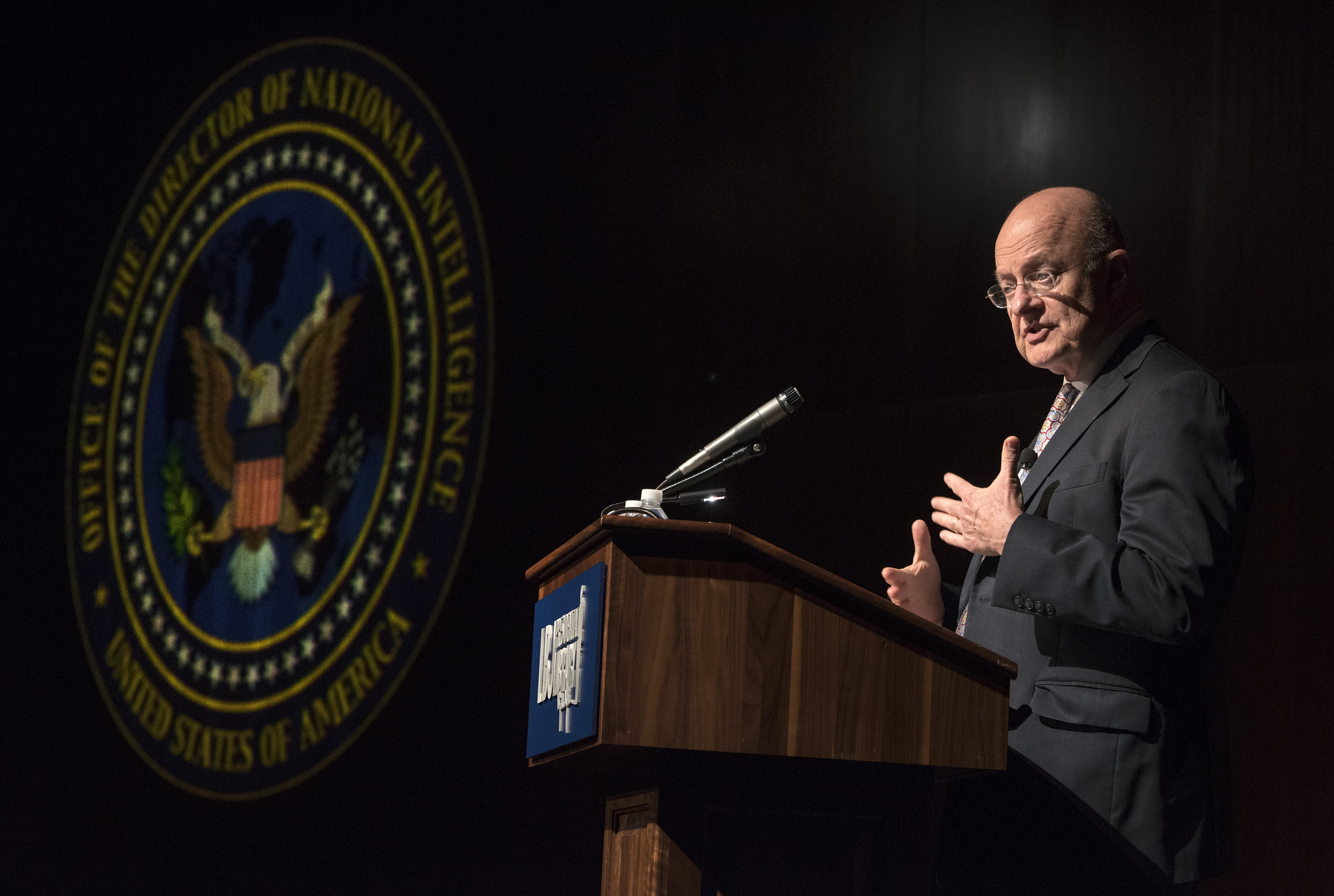
In May 2017, James Clapper, the former director of national intelligence, told NBC's Meet the Press that Russians are "almost genetically driven" to act deviously.

Several operatives and lawyers in the U.S. intelligence community reacted strongly to Trump's performance at the summit, describing it as "subservien[ce] to Putin" and "a fervent defense of Russia's military and cyber aggression around the world, and its violation of international law in Ukraine". Some framed Trump's conduct as harmful to U.S. interests and an asset to Russian interests, suggesting that he was a "useful idiot" to Putin, and that he looked like "Putin's puppet". Former Director of National Intelligence James Clapper wondered "if Russians have something on Trump", and former CIA director John O. Brennan accused Trump of treason, tweeting: "He is wholly in the pocket of Putin." In January 2019, former acting CIA director Michael Morell called Trump "an unwitting agent of the Russian federation", echoing the sentiments of former CIA director Michael V. Hayden. House Speaker Nancy Pelosi suggested then-president Trump's behavior was part of a pattern: "All roads lead to Putin."

=== Biden administration (2021–2025) ===
Following the arrest of Russian opposition leader Alexei Navalny on January 17, 2021, Jake Sullivan, Biden's national security advisor, stated: "Mr. Navalny should be immediately released, and the perpetrators of the outrageous attack on his life must be held accountable. The Kremlin's attacks on Mr. Navalny are not just a violation of human rights, but an affront to the Russian people who want their voices heard."

On the day of Biden's inauguration, Russia urged the new administration to take a "more constructive" approach in talks over the extension of the 2010 New START treaty, accusing the first Trump administration of "deliberately and intentionally" dismantling international arms control agreements and attacking its "counterproductive and openly aggressive" approach in talks. On January 26, Biden and Putin agreed that they would extend by five years the New START treaty, which would otherwise have expired in February 2021.

On March 17, 2021, the Russian foreign ministry announced that Russia had recalled its ambassador to the U.S., Anatoly Antonov, for "consultations" in a move that was characterized by the ministry's spokesperson as being without precedent for a Russia ambassador to the U.S. The recall came after Biden said he thought that Putin was "a killer" and said he would "pay the price" for the interference in the 2020 U.S. election, which had been confirmed by a declassified DNI report released the previous day. The State Department commented on the recall by saying that while the U.S. would work with Russia to advance U.S. interests, they would "be able to hold Russia accountable for any of their malign actions".

On April 15, the U.S. announced the expulsion of 10 Russian diplomats and imposed sanctions on six Russian technology companies as well as 32 other individuals and entities. The new sanctions also targeted ruble-denominated sovereign debt. Nevertheless, the economic punishments were assessed by observers as "more bark than bite" and likely to be "largely symbolic", with the ruble even rebounding against the dollar on the news. Biden commented the United States "could have gone further" with the sanctions, but that he had opted for a milder form of sovereign-debt sanctions for now because he wanted to avoid a "cycle of escalation and conflict." Russia retaliated the following day, expelling 10 U.S. diplomats and suggesting the U.S. ambassador return home for consultations.

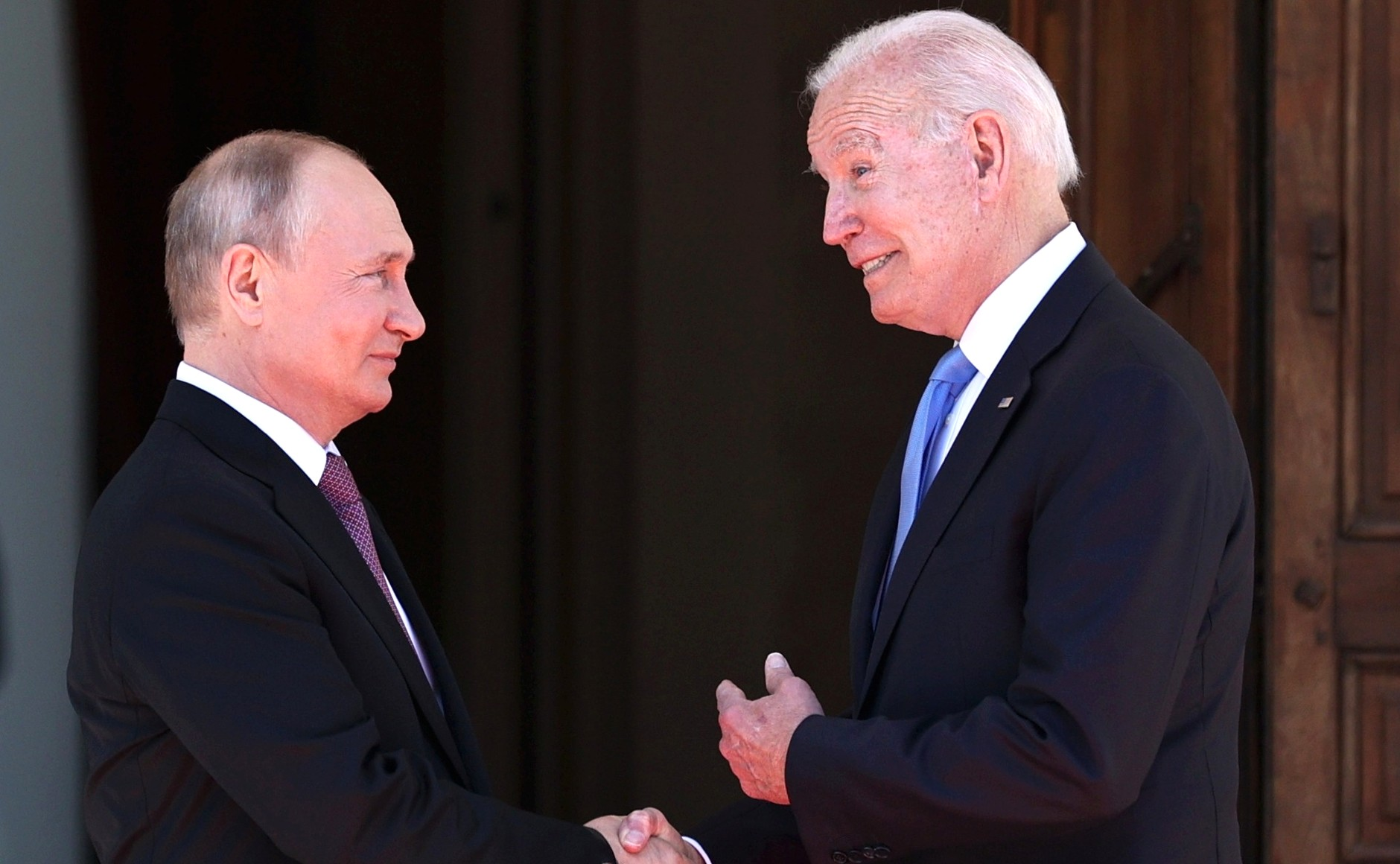
US president Joe Biden and Russian president Vladimir Putin at the summit meeting in Geneva, June 2021

On May 19, the Biden administration lifted sanctions on the Nord Stream 2 gas pipeline that was being built between Russia and Germany. While President Biden believed the project was bad, the U.S. State Department explained it had concluded that it was in the "U.S. national interest" to waive the sanctions.

In May 2021, Biden and Putin agreed to meet as the relationship between the countries was being assessed to be at the lowest point since the 1980s. At the meeting in Geneva in mid-June, the countries′ leaders reached an agreement to return their ambassadors to their posts in each other's capitals, no progress was made in overcoming the major points of contention.

On August 21, the Department of State imposed increased sanctions on Russia for alleged poisoning of Alexei Navalny. These sanctions include a ban on ammunition imports into the United States, as well as restrictions of small arm sales.

On December 1, 2021, Russia's Foreign Ministry told U.S. diplomats who have been working in Moscow for more than three years, to leave the country by January 31, 2022. The move came in response to news on November 28, 2021, that the US would be expelling 27 Russian diplomatic staff by the end of January 2022.

On February 21, 2023, Russian president Vladimir Putin suspended the New START agreement.

==== 2021–2022 Russo-Ukrainian crisis ====
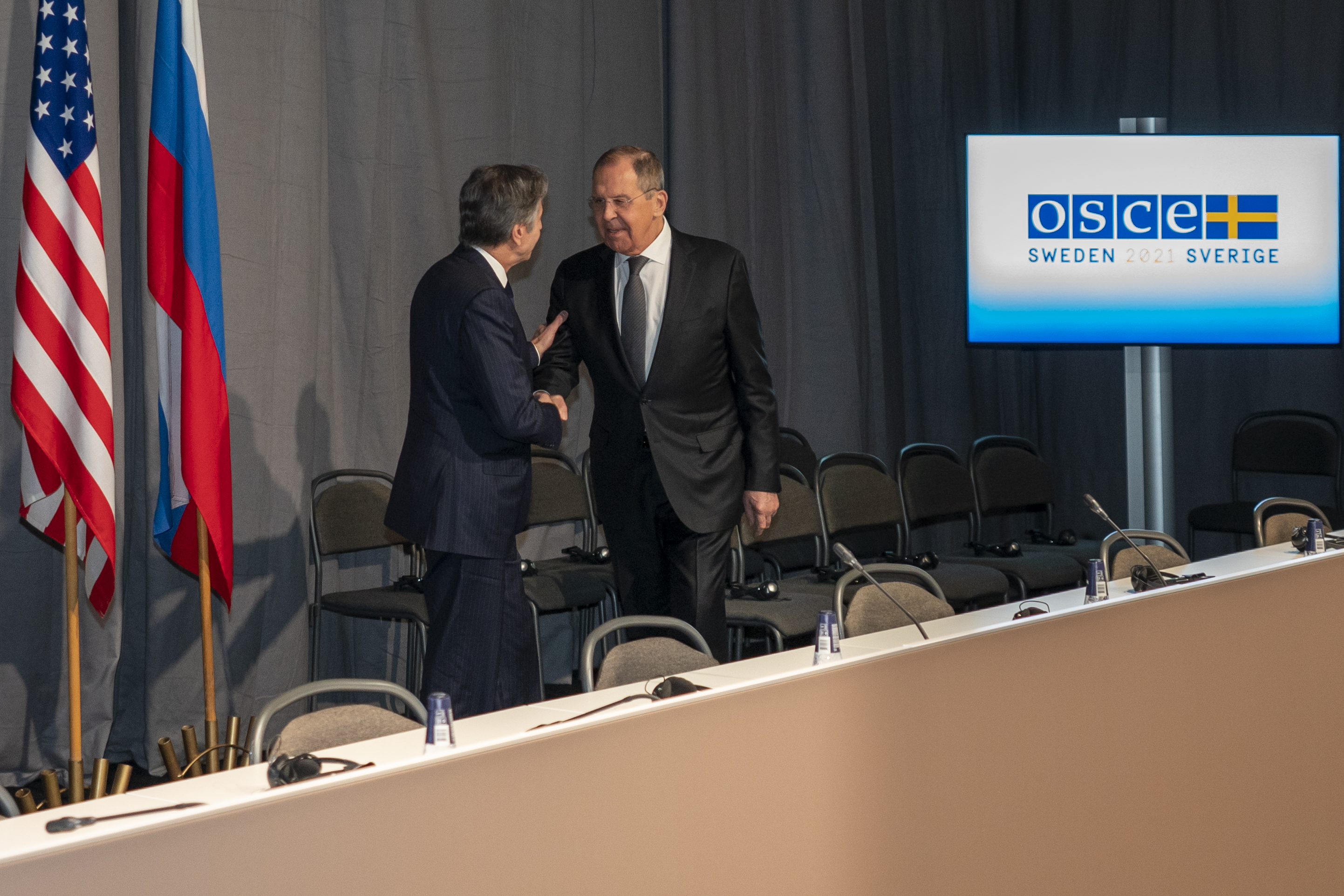
Russian foreign minister Sergey Lavrov meets with U.S. secretary of state Antony Blinken on December 2, 2021

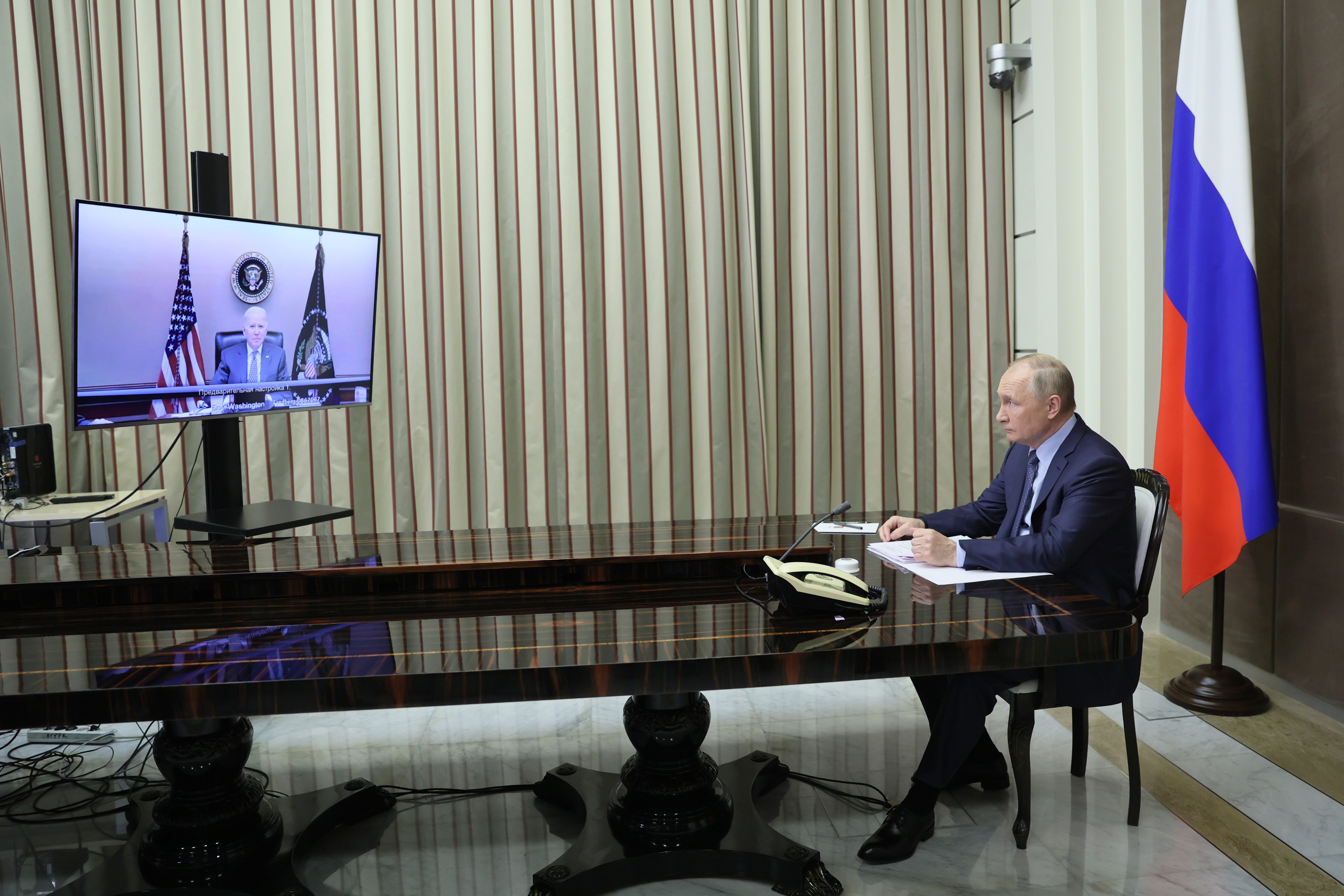
U.S. president Joe Biden holds a video call with Russian president Vladimir Putin, on December 7, 2021

In late 2021 and early 2022, Russian troops build up along the Russo-Ukrainian border, resulted in renewed tensions between Russia and NATO. Senior officials of the Biden administration reported that Russia had only withdrawn a few thousand troops since the previous military buildup in early 2021. The New York Times estimated over 80,000 Russian troops still remain at the Russo-Ukrainian border by September 2021. The Kremlin repeatedly denied that it had any plans to invade Ukraine.

On November 30, 2021, Putin stated that an expansion of NATO's presence in Ukraine, especially the deployment of any long-range missiles capable of striking Russian cities or missile defence systems similar to those in Romania and Poland, would be a "red line" issue for the Kremlin. Putin asked President Joe Biden for legal guarantees that NATO wouldn't expand eastward or put "weapons systems that threaten us in close vicinity to Russian territory." The U.S. rejected Putin's demands.

Biden and Putin discussed the crisis over the course of a 50-minute phone call on December 30, 2021. Bilateral talks began in Geneva on January 10, 2022, to discuss the Russo-Ukrainian war as well as longstanding Russian concerns regarding NATO postering in Eastern Europe. The talks were led by Russian Deputy Foreign Minister Sergei Ryabkov and U.S. Deputy Secretary of State Wendy Sherman. On January 31, 2022, both the United States and Russia discussed the crisis at an emergency meeting of the UN Security Council. The discussion was tense, with both sides accusing the other of stoking tensions.

The United States government increased military support to Ukraine through a $650 million arms deal. U.S. Secretary of Defense Lloyd Austin and Chairman of the Joint Chiefs of Staff Mark Milley threatened U.S. support for an anti-Russian insurgency within Ukraine. The Biden administration approved deliveries of American-made FIM-92 Stinger surface-to-air missiles to Ukraine. The government threatened severe sanctions against Russia as well as personal sanctions against Putin and his allies. The United States also threatened to halt the opening of the Nord Stream 2 pipeline that would send Russian natural gas to Germany, "if Russia invades Ukraine one way or another."

In January 2022, the United States accused Russia of sending saboteurs into Ukraine to stage "a false-flag operation" that would create a pretext for Russia to invade Ukraine. Russian foreign minister Sergey Lavrov dismissed the U.S. claim as "total disinformation." On February 4, 2022, Lavrov dismissed as "nonsense" and "craziness" allegations by the United States that Russia was preparing a fake video of the Ukrainian forces attacking the separatist-held Donbas as a pretext for starting a war in Ukraine.

On January 19, 2022, President Biden said that he believed Russia would invade Ukraine. Biden said a full-scale invasion of Ukraine would be "the most consequential thing that's happened in the world in terms of war and peace" since World War II. Biden and Ukrainian president Volodymyr Zelenskyy disagreed on how imminent the threat was. On February 10, 2022, Biden urged all American citizens in Ukraine to leave immediately. On February 11, 2022, Biden's national security advisor Jake Sullivan publicly warned about the likelihood of a Russian invasion of Ukraine prior to the end of the 2022 Winter Olympics.

The Chicago Council on Global Affairs poll, conducted on July 26, 2021, found that 50% of Americans supported the use of U.S. troops to defend Ukraine if Russia invaded the rest of the country.

In December 2021, a Levada Center poll found that about 50% of Russians believed that the U.S. and NATO were responsible for the Russo-Ukrainian crisis, while 16% blamed Ukraine and just 4% blamed Russia.

In February 2022, according to the White House, U.S. president Joe Biden stated in a video conference with Russian president Vladimir Putin that if Russia invades Ukraine, Washington and its allies will respond "decisively and impose fast and severe penalties."

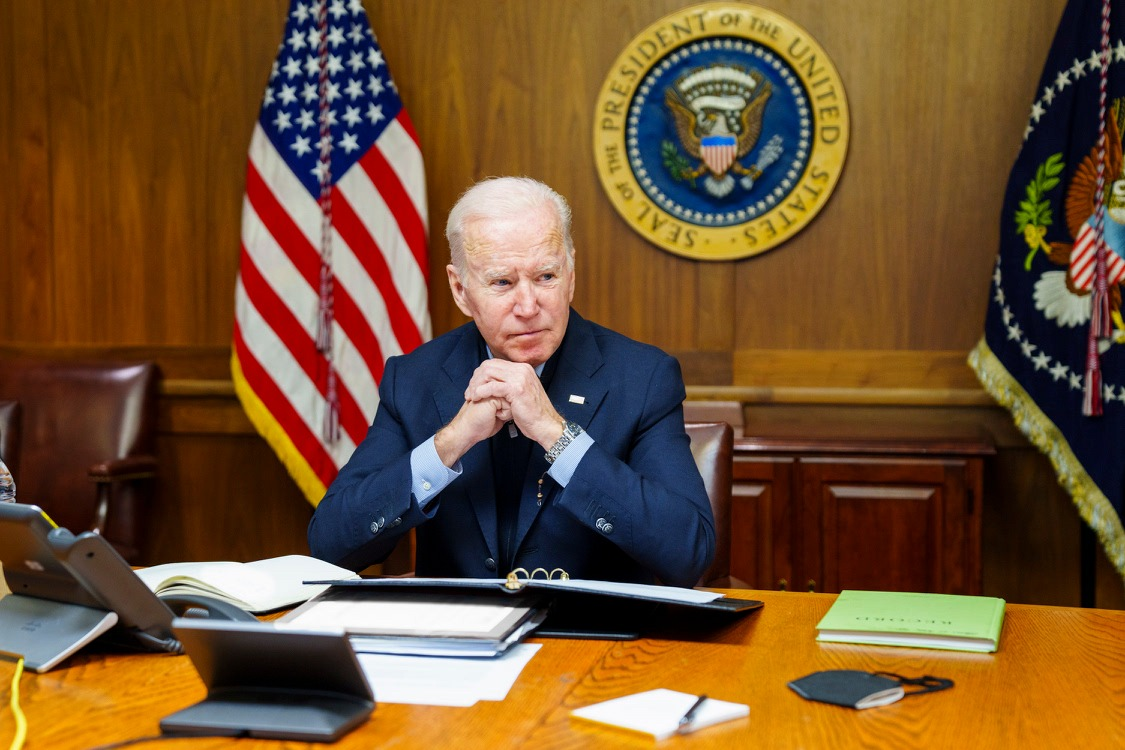
A majority of Americans disapprove of President Joe Biden's handling of the Russo-Ukrainian crisis.

On February 16, 2022, the U.S. State Department stated that Russia is seeking to establish a "pretext" for invading Ukraine by making unsubstantiated claims of "genocide" and mass graves in Ukraine's eastern Donbas region.

On February 20, 2022, the US secretary of state showed his concern about the continuation of Russian military drills in Belarus. According to Antony Blinken, Moscow's decision to keep roughly 30,000 troops in Belarus, near to Ukraine, amid increased tensions in the east justifies US's concerns.

On February 22, 2022, U.S. president Joe Biden criticized Russia's recognition of the Donetsk People's Republic and the Luhansk People's Republic as "the beginning of the Russian invasion of Ukraine" and announced sanctions against on banks VEB and Promsvyazbank and comprehensive sanctions on Russia's sovereign debt in response.

==== Russian invasion of Ukraine and significantly increased tensions ====
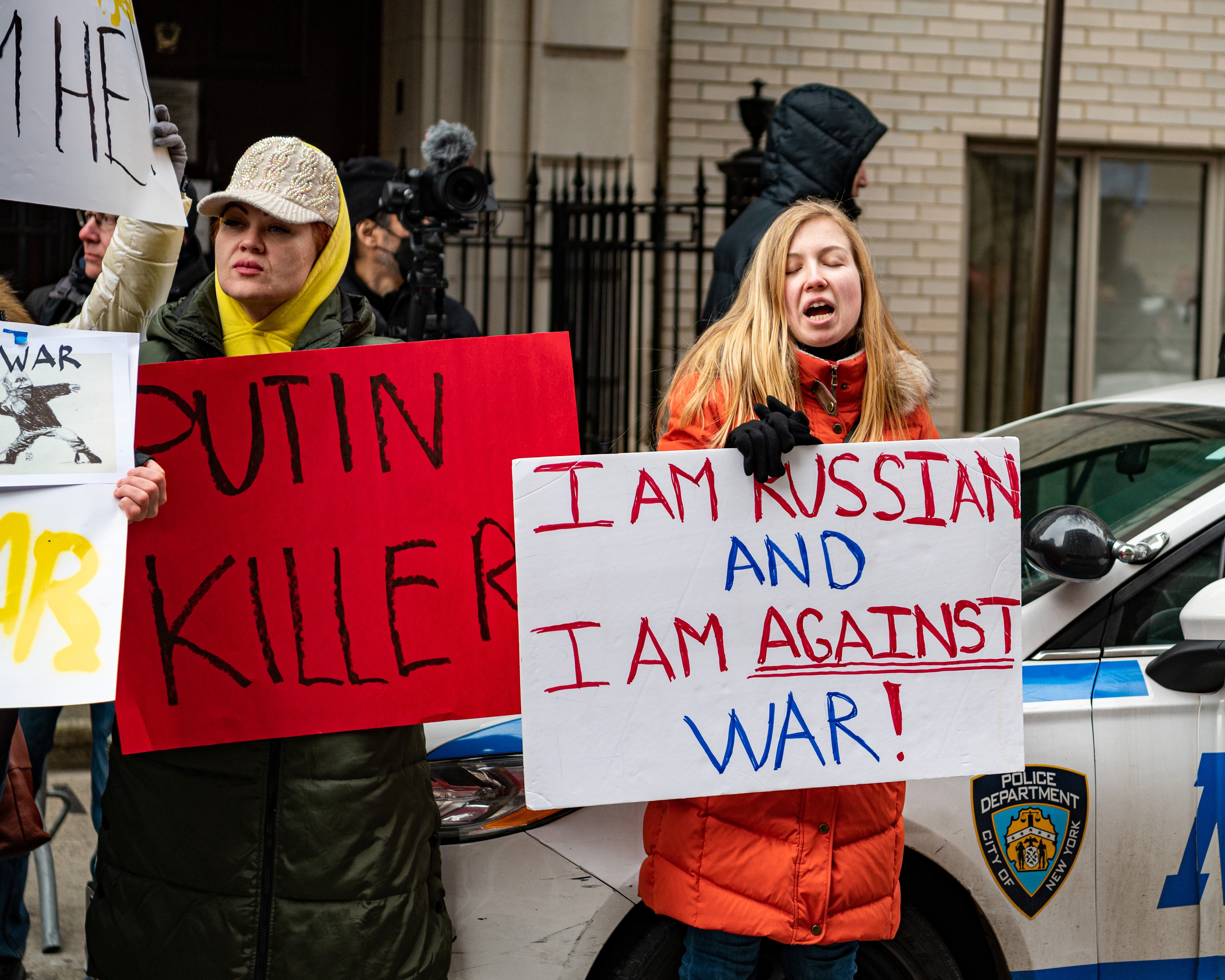
Protest against the war outside the Russian Consulate in New York City on February 24, 2022

On February 24, 2022, Russia launched an invasion of Ukraine opening fire with explosive ordinance and hitting several residential buildings, by the 25th the invading army had taken all of the Chernobyl exclusion zone and began to attack the Ukrainian capital with high resistance from both the Ukrainian military and a makeshift militia. On February 26, President Joe Biden authorized the US State Department to deliver up to $350 million in weapons from US stockpiles to Ukraine.

President Joe Biden rejected the idea of a NATO-enforced no-fly zone over Ukraine, in order to avoid a direct war with Russia.

On February 26, 2022, the deputy head of Russia's Security Council chaired by President Vladimir Putin, warned that Moscow may retaliate to international sanctions by withdrawing from the most recent nuclear arms treaty with the US, severing diplomatic ties with Western nations, and freezing their assets.

On February 28, 2022, the U.S., during a meeting with the U.N., asked the Russian ambassador, Vasily Nebenzya, to remove 12 Russian diplomats from the U.S. under claims of abuse of power.

On March 4, 2022, the United States and its allies strongly denounced Russia at the United Nations on Friday for shelling and seizing Europe's largest nuclear power facility overnight in Ukraine, and some insisted that Moscow not allow such an action to happen again.

On March 13, 2022, President Biden's National Security Adviser Jake Sullivan warned of a full-fledged NATO response if Russia were to hit any part of NATO territory.

The United States is on Russia's "Unfriendly Countries List" (red). Countries and territories on the list have imposed or joined sanctions against Russia.

The poll, conducted by NPR/Ipsos between March 18 and 21, 2022, found that only 36% of Americans approved the Biden administration's response to the invasion.

On April 28, 2022, President Biden asked Congress for an additional $33 billion to assist Ukraine, including $20 billion to provide weapons to Ukraine.

On July 6, 2022, the speaker of the Russian Parliament threatened the US about the possible "return" of Alaska to Russia.

On September 21, 2022, President Putin warned the US and NATO during his partial mobilization speech regarding Russia's ability to use nuclear weapons, stating that if Russia's "territorial integrity" was threatened, Russia would "certainly make use of all weapon systems available" to them.

On September 27, 2022, White House press secretary Karine Jean-Pierre encouraged Russian men fleeing their home country to avoid being drafted to apply for asylum in the United States. In early 2023, the Biden administration resumed deportations of Russians who had fled Russia due to mobilization and political persecution. Texas-based attorney Jennifer Scarborough said that "In March of 2022, the US said they were stopping deportations to Russia because of the political situation – so I don't understand why they restarted it and they did it so quietly."

On January 25, 2023, the Biden administration decided to supply 31 M1 Abrams tanks to Ukraine.

In February 2023, the United States stepped up efforts to pressure the countries, including Turkey and the United Arab Emirates, to stop the commercial activities that had been benefiting Russia and helping them to evade international sanctions. Turkey, a NATO member, and the United Arab Emirates, a close ally of the US, agreed to Western pressure and imposed sanctions on Russia.

A Gallup poll conducted in June 2023 found that 62% of respondents in the United States wanted to support Ukraine in regaining territory that Russia had captured, even if it meant prolonging the war between Russia and Ukraine, while 32% wanted to end the war as quickly as possible, even if it meant allowing Russia to keep the territory it captured and annexed in southeastern Ukraine. According to a 2023 CNN poll, 55% of American respondents said the US Congress should not approve additional funding to support Ukraine, while 45% would support additional funding.

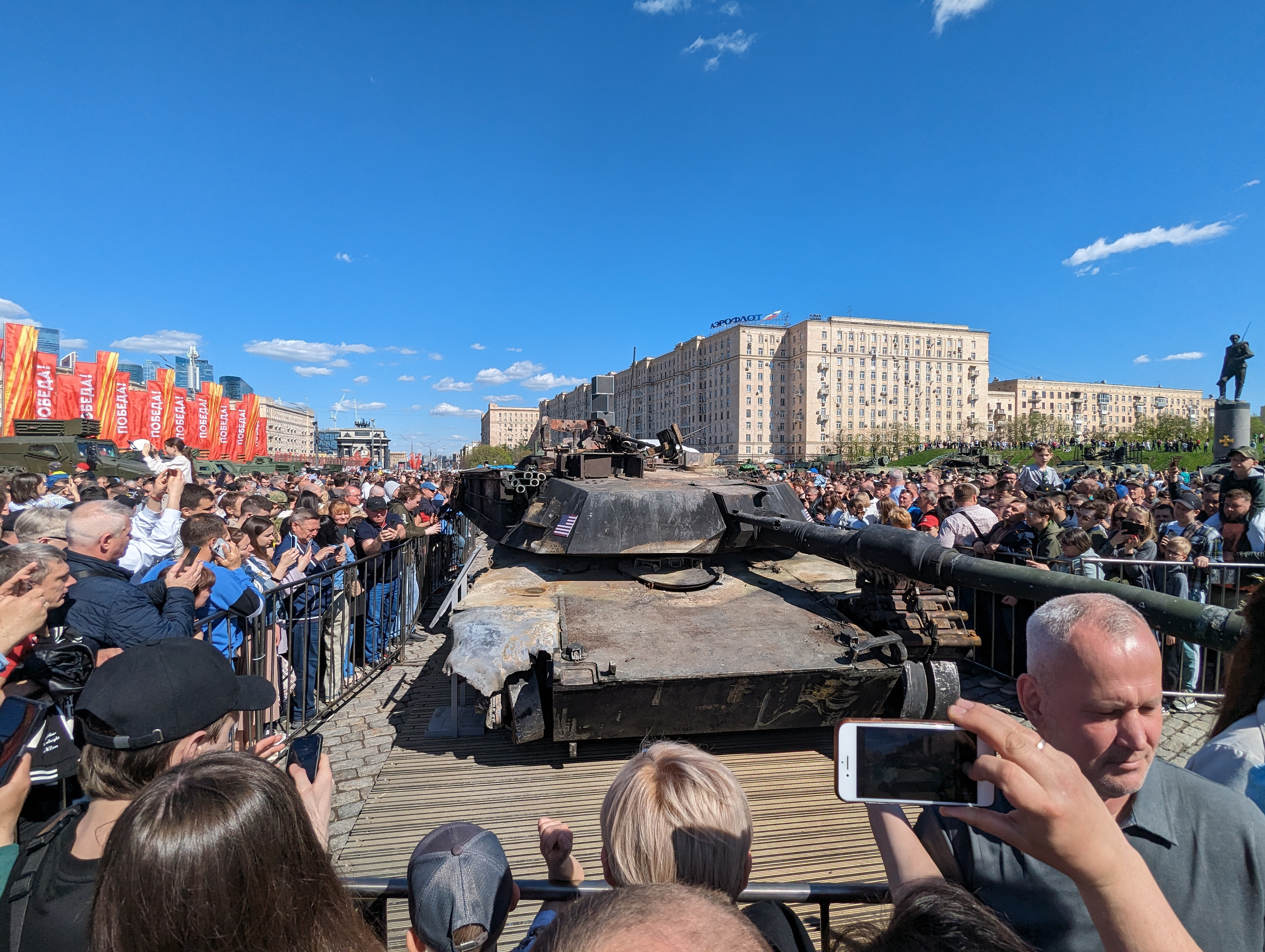
A captured US-supplied M1 Abrams main battle tank in Ukrainian service on display at Moscow's Victory Park on Poklonnaya Hill, 2024

In 2022, Congress approved more than $112 billion to help Ukraine in its war with Russia. At the end of 2023, the White House requested $61.4 billion more for Ukraine for the year ahead.

In January 2024, the Biden administration rejected Vladimir Putin's proposal for a ceasefire in Ukraine. Biden's national security advisor Jake Sullivan informed Putin's foreign policy adviser Yuri Ushakov that the United States would not discuss a ceasefire without Ukraine's participation.

On April 13, 2024, the London Metal Exchange set out measures following US and UK imposed sanctions that banned delivery of new Russian metal including aluminum, copper and nickel. Aim of this decision is to agitate Russian export revenue as Moscow continues it war against Ukraine.

On May 30, 2024, Biden gave Ukraine permission to strike targets inside Russia near the Kharkiv region using American-supplied weapons. The Russians were then exploiting the artificial limitation to focus attacks on the city, which lies 60 km from the frontier. A little later he sat with David Muir during the D-Day memorial in Normandy France and said "They are authorized to be used in proximity to the border. We are not authorizing strikes 200 miles into Russia. We are not authorizing strikes on Moscow, on the Kremlin." On August 9, 2024, a convoy of Russian troops in the Kursk Oblast of Russia was destroyed in a strike by U.S.-supplied HIMARS rocket system in what the Russian Telegram channel called "one of the bloodiest and most massive strikes in the entire war."

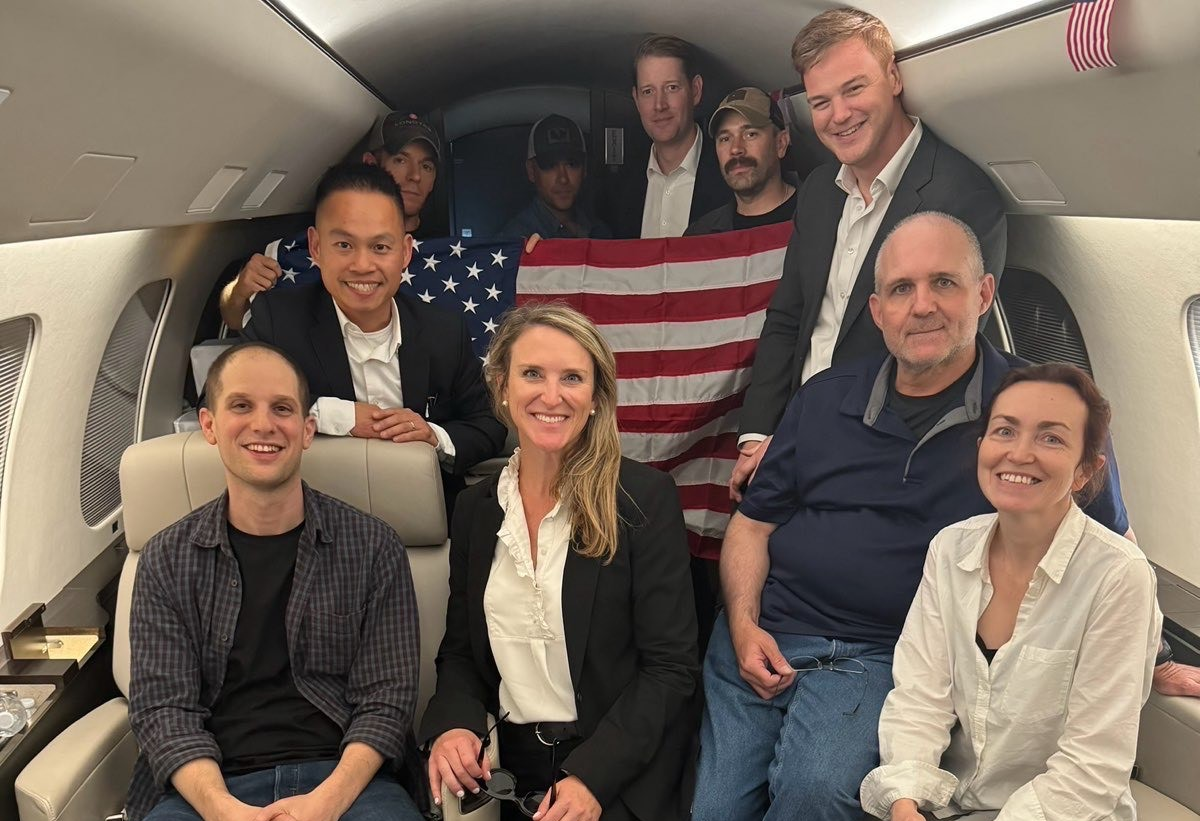
Alsu Kurmasheva, Paul Whelan and Evan Gershkovich together with government officials and staff on their return flight to the U.S. on August 1, 2024

In June 2024, the U.S. sanctioned multiple Hong Kong firms, for facilitating trade in gold produced by Russia's Polyus. As per the Treasury Department, several Hong Kong and the UAE-based were used to convert payments from sale of Russian gold into fiat currency and cryptocurrency. Hong Kong's Holden International Trading Limited and Taube Precious HK Limited were used to route payments, while the UAE-based Red Coast Metals Trading DMCC to obscure payments from Russian gold sale. Besides, Hong Kong-based VPower Finance Security was transporting the Russian gold.

On July 28, 2024, Russian president Vladimir Putin threatened to deploy long-range missiles that could hit all of Europe after the United States announced its intention to deploy long-range missiles in Germany starting in 2026 that could hit Russian territory within 10 minutes.

On August 1, 2024, the United States and Russia conducted the most extensive prisoner exchange since the end of the Cold War, involving the release of twenty-six people.

Since the Russian invasion of Ukraine, the persecution of Russian citizens who disagree with the policies of Russian leader Vladimir Putin has increased significantly. For example, in early 2024, ballet dancer Ksenia Karelina, a dual American-Russian citizen and resident of Los Angeles, was arrested while visiting family in Russia and charged with treason for sending $51.80 to Razom, a New York City-based nonprofit organization that sends humanitarian assistance to Ukraine. She initially faced life in prison, but pleaded guilty and was sentenced to 12 years in prison.

=== Second Trump administration (2025–present) ===
Russia has yet to observe any meaningful progress on nuclear disarmament from the new U.S. administration, as stated by Gennady Gatilov on February 9, 2025, Russia's Permanent Representative to the UN in Geneva. While expressing readiness for collaboration, Gatilov highlighted the lack of advancement in nuclear arms control discussions, with the New START Treaty set to expire in 2026.

==== Talks on the Russo-Ukrainian War and normalizing relations ====
Donald Trump spoke to Vladimir Putin by telephone on February 12, 2025, in what was their first known contact since Trump had been inaugurated for his second term as U.S. president. They discussed a range of topics, including opening negotiations to end the war and arranging a summit meeting. Trump announced afterwards that peace talks would begin "immediately" and that U.S. secretary of state Marco Rubio, U.S. national security advisor Mike Waltz, CIA director John Ratcliffe, and Special Envoy Steve Witkoff will lead the negotiations. Trump also announced that he could meet with Putin in Saudi Arabia, and that Saudi Crown Prince Mohammed bin Salman could have a role in the talks, but no decision had been made at that time.

On February 15, Russian foreign minister Sergey Lavrov spoke to Marco Rubio by telephone about a number of topics, including the Russo-Ukrainian War, arranging a high-level meeting in Saudi Arabia, and potential cooperation on the situation in the Middle East. The conversation, which was the first contact between Russia and the U.S. at the foreign minister level in almost two years, was also seen as a sign that the two countries were restoring regular contact between their governments.

Kremlin Press Secretary Dmitry Peskov said on February 17 that the Riyadh talks will be about "restoring the entire range of U.S.-Russian relations, as well as preparing possible talks on the Ukrainian settlement and organizing a meeting of the two presidents." Tammy Bruce, the U.S. State Department Spokesperson, stated on the same day that the talks were to see if a potential war settlement was possible, in which case more detailed negotiations could move forward. Sergey Lavrov ruled out the participation of the European Union countries. He also said, speaking of the earlier phone call between Putin and Trump, that the two presidents "agreed to leave behind that absolutely abnormal period in relations between our great powers when they effectively halted any contacts except for some technical and humanitarian issues." Shortly before the talks, Kirill Dmitriev, the head of Russia's sovereign wealth fund, met with the U.S. delegation to discuss the economic relationship between their countries.

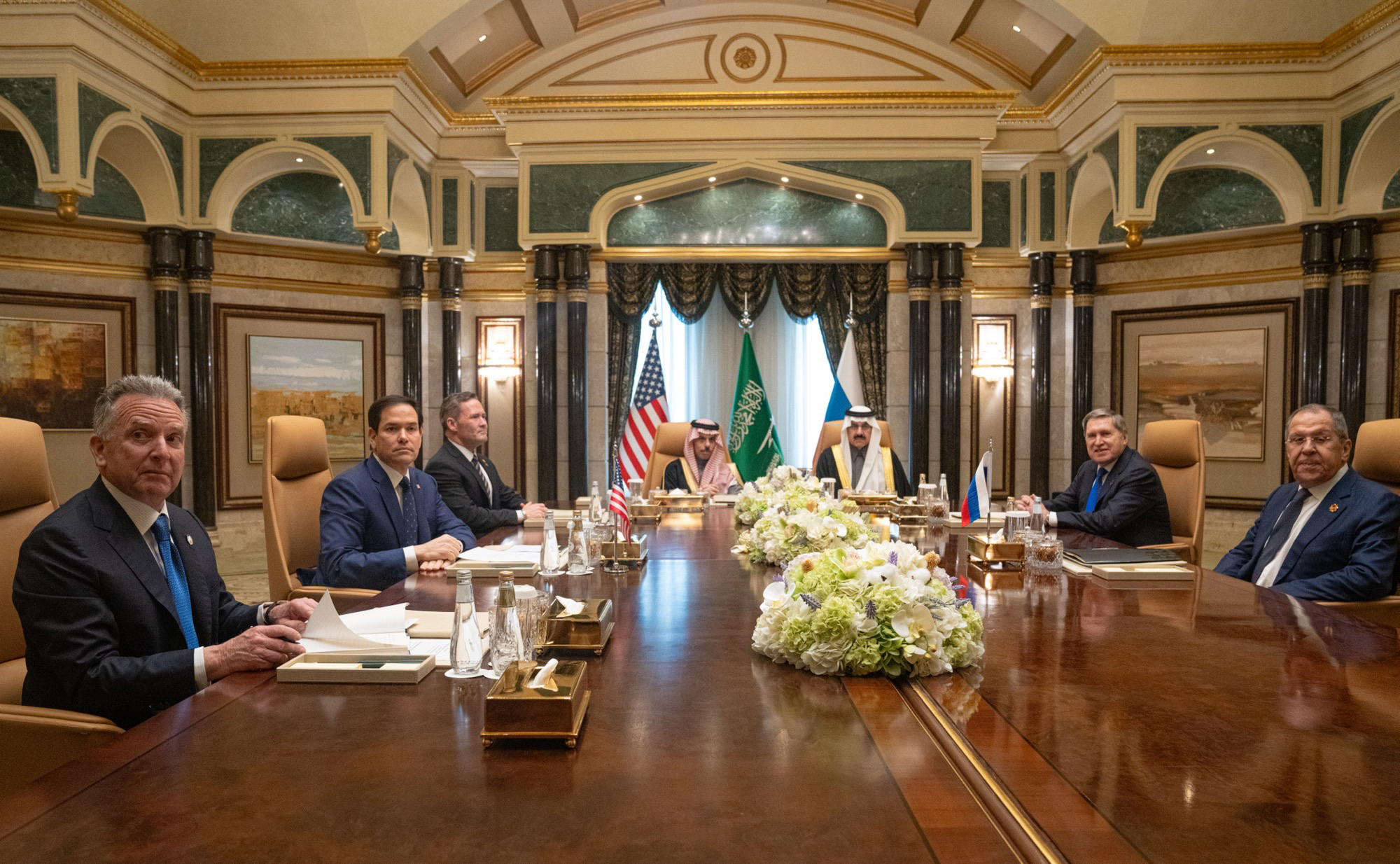
U.S., Saudi, and Russian officials meeting in Riyadh, February 18, 2025

The Riyadh meeting was held on February 18, with Rubio, Waltz, and Witkoff on the American side, and Lavrov and Presidential Aide Yuri Ushakov on the Russian side. Saudi Arabian foreign minister Faisal bin Farhan Al Saud and National Security Adviser Musaad bin Mohammed Al Aiban were also there. The delegations agreed to begin the negotiation process for ending the war in Ukraine (though the Ukrainians were not invited to the talks), to establish a high-level mechanism for contact between the U.S. and Russian governments, and to work to eventually normalize their economic and diplomatic ties. This will include restoring the staff of both of their embassies to normal levels, after the expulsions of diplomats in previous years. Lavrov said after the talks: "We weren't just listening to each other, but we heard each other. I have reason to believe that the American side started to better understand our positions."

Yuri Ushakov, the Russian presidential advisor on foreign policy, said after the Riyadh meeting that preparations for a Trump-Putin summit have begun, though no date had been decided yet. According to Kirill Dmitriev, they also discussed the possibility of restoring joint energy exploration projects in the Arctic, where ExxonMobil previously had a partnership with Rosneft before leaving due to economic sanctions in 2018. The U.S.-Russia talks in Riyadh, their most extensive negotiation in three years, have been described as representing an "extraordinary turnaround" and a "head-spinning reset" in the relations between the two countries. Speaking at a press conference on the same day, Trump said that he will "probably" meet Putin later in February. Rubio said a potential meeting between Trump and Putin would "largely depend on whether we can make progress on ending the war in Ukraine."

Trump said on February 21 that Russia attacked Ukraine, but blamed Biden for failing to prevent it and Zelenskyy for abandoning peace talks. He also said that Zelenskyy and Putin should negotiate an end to the war to prevent further killings of young soldiers and the deaths of "millions" of people.

On February 24, the US voted against a UN General Assembly resolution condemning Russia's invasion of Ukraine. Alongside this resolution, the US introduced a separate resolution in the General Assembly which was worded in neutral terms. However, this resolution was significantly changed after several amendments, and Russia voted against it. The US later re-introduced that resolution in the Security Council, which ultimately approved it.

On February 27, Trump extended a series of sanctions against Russia over its invasion of Ukraine for one year.

On March 4, the media reported that the United States had suspended all military aid to Ukraine. Director of the CIA John Ratcliffe confirmed this, along with the suspension of intelligence sharing with Ukraine. Aid and intelligence sharing was resumed on March 11 following talks with Ukrainian officials in Jeddah, Saudi Arabia.

In June 2025, a majority of U.S. senators supported secondary sanctions against Russia that would impose 500% tariffs on countries that buy Russian oil, natural gas, uranium and other exports. Majority Leader John Thune said senators "stand ready to provide President Trump with any tools he needs to get Russia to finally come to the table in a real way."

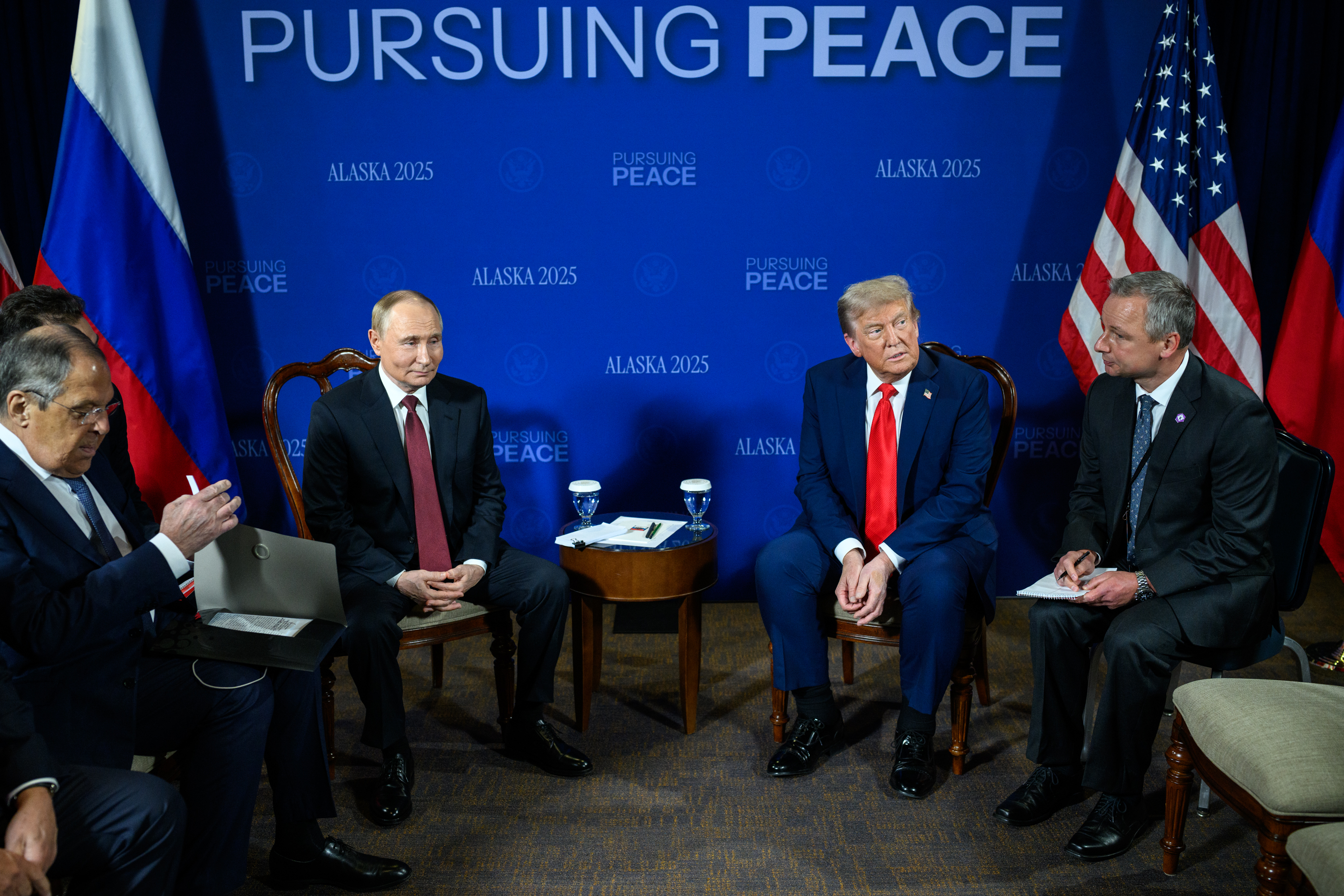
US president Donald Trump, Russian president Vladimir Putin and Russian foreign minister Sergey Lavrov at the summit meeting in Alaska, August 2025

In June 2025, Trump rejected Putin's offer to mediate a ceasefire in the Iran–Israel war, telling him to focus on mediating a ceasefire in the Russo-Ukrainian War. On June 22, 2025, Putin condemned Trump's strikes on Iranian nuclear sites as an "unprovoked act of aggression".

A summit meeting took place on August 15, 2025, in the U.S. state of Alaska, between President of the United States Donald Trump and President of Russia Vladimir Putin. The meeting, announced by Trump on August 8, 2025, focused on negotiations toward a ceasefire and potential peace agreement in the ongoing Russo–Ukrainian War. Trump suggested that the talks could include proposals involving territorial adjustments, an idea publicly rejected by Ukrainian president Volodymyr Zelenskyy, who insisted that no settlement can occur without Ukraine's participation or territorial concessions. This was the first high-level bilateral meeting between the two countries on U.S. soil since the 1988 Governors Island Summit. Alaska was selected in part due to its historical ties to Russia and because it lies outside the jurisdiction of the International Criminal Court, which has issued an arrest warrant for Putin. The summit sparked controversy over its agenda, format, and symbolism. Central to the dispute was President Trump's suggestion of potential territorial "swaps" as part of a Ukraine peace deal.

In late August 2025, as U.S.-Russia relations showed signs of renewed engagement, both leaders expressed interest in expanded economic cooperation. Concurrently, ExxonMobil and Russia's state-owned Rosneft had secretly outlined a roadmap for resuming joint operations at the Sakhalin-1 oil and gas project, contingent on government approvals and progress in Ukraine peace negotiations. Exxon Senior Vice President Neil Chapman led the discussions with Rosneft CEO Igor Sechin, while Exxon also sought support from the U.S. government for its potential return. According to officials, the company received a favorable response, and CEO Darren Woods held recent talks with President Trump at the White House regarding the matter.

On October 22, 2025, the United States imposed sanctions on Russian energy companies Rosneft and Lukoil, affecting their customers in China and India.

In November 2025, Trump proposed a peace plan that would require Ukraine to cede territory in the Donbas, including Ukrainian-controlled parts of Donetsk Oblast. The plan would also freeze the front lines in Kherson Oblast and Zaporizhzhia Oblast.

Between February 28 and March 1, 2026, relations between the United States and Russia deteriorated again after the massive attack on Iran led by Trump and Israeli Prime Minister Netanyahu, which led to Ali Khamenei's death, Iran's supreme leader since 1989.

During the conflict Russia provided Iran with intelligence and improved drone technology to target U.S. military assets in the Middle East.

On a call on March 9, Trump rejected Putin’s offer to mediate a ceasefire between the United States and Iran and a proposal for Russia to house the latter’s enriched uranium. In a press conference after the call, he said, ”[Putin] wants to be helpful [with Iran]. I told him you can be more helpful by ending the war in Ukraine.”

President Trump after signing the Sanctioning Russia Act in the Oval Office, September 18, 2026

During ceasefire talks on March 12 concerning the Russo-Ukrainian war in Miami, Florida, special presidential envoy Dimitriev offered that Russia wouldn’t provide military intelligence to Iran if the United States did the same for Ukraine which Witkoff and Jared Kushner rejected.

Throughout June 2026, Russia grew dissatisfied with the United States-led mediation aimed at diplomatically ending the Russo-Ukrainian war, which Russia hoped would be on favourable terms. Russian Minister of Foreign Affairs Sergey Lavrov said the United States was “seemingly stepping back from the role of an objective mediator,” claiming it “forgot” about agreements that were reached during the 2025 Russia–United States summit. The United States reverted to its original support for a ceasefire rather than a comprehensive peace agreement as Russia demanded, with Trump considering abandoning any agreements reached with Russia during the summit. Russia was also now skeptical of Witkoff and Kushner as interlocutors and mediators in the process due to their freewheeling approach and only periodic visits during said process. When questioned about Lavrov’s claims, U.S. secretary of state Marco Rubio answered, “There was no agreement in Alaska. There was a proposal in Alaska, but there was no agreement in Alaska. If there had been an agreement, we would have had an end to the war.”

Trump with Russian President Vladimir Putin and Chinese leader Xi Jinping ahead of their trilateral meeting at the 2026 APEC summit, November 19, 2026

On July 8, 2026, during the 2026 Ankara NATO summit, Trump said that the United States would grant Ukraine a license to manufacture Patriot missile interceptors.

On October 11, 2026, seven U.S. senators from both parties urged the Trump administration to undo its diesel supply agreement with Russia. Their claim was that the deal broke the 2022 congressional ban on Russian energy imports, which bars those imports until Russia stops its aggression against Ukraine. They also said the administration failed to consult Congress or offer a legal basis for the move, even though the law requires it. Trump said he wanted to lower fuel prices ahead of the 2026 United States elections, as the war with Iran had disrupted energy markets and driven prices higher.

In November 2026, Putin and Trump held an informal meeting on the sidelines of APEC China 2026, followed by a trilateral meeting with the two leaders and Chinese leader Xi Jinping.

== Russian and U.S. intelligence operations ==
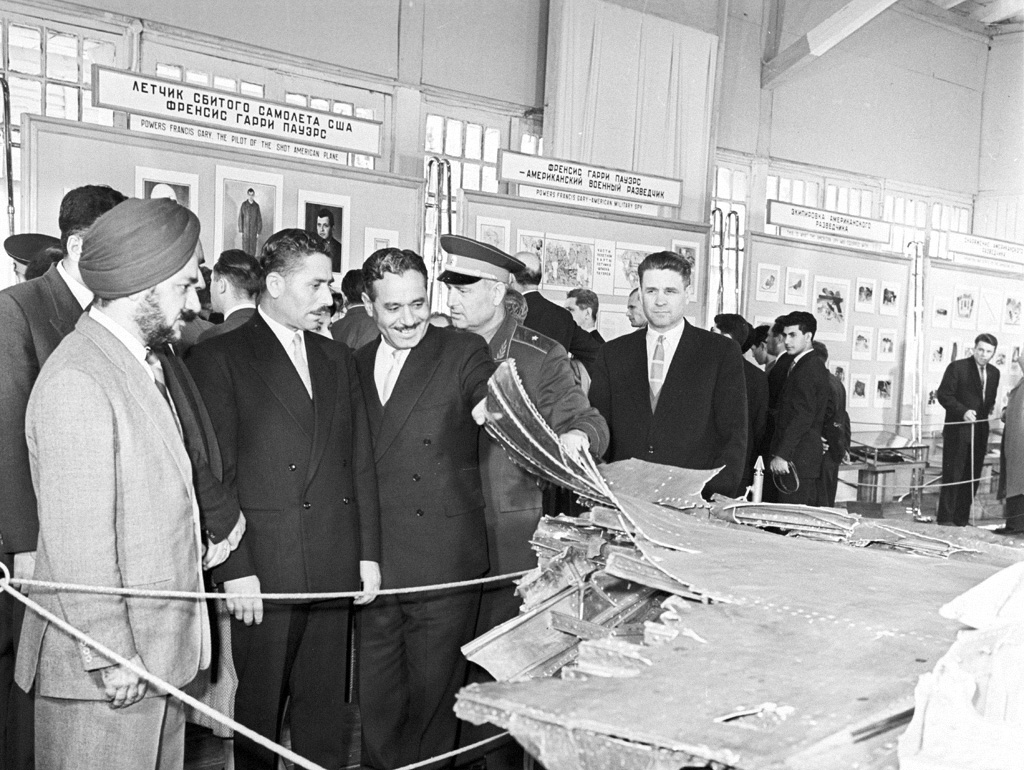
Military attaches of foreign embassies visiting the exhibition of remains of U.S. U-2 reconnaissance aircraft destroyed on May 1, 1960, near Sverdlovsk (now Yekaterinburg).

The Soviet Union's systemic espionage efforts in the U.S. began in the 1920s.

In April 2015, CNN reported that "Russian hackers" had "penetrated sensitive parts of the White House" computers in "recent months." It was said that the FBI, the Secret Service, and other U.S. intelligence agencies categorized the attacks "among the most sophisticated attacks ever launched against U.S. government systems."

In 2017, a cybersecurity specialist working in the Federal Security Service was arrested by Russian authorities on suspicion of passing information to U.S. intelligence.

In June 2019, Russia said that its electrical grid had come under cyber-attack by the United States. The New York Times reported that American hackers from the United States Cyber Command planted malware potentially capable of disrupting the Russian electrical grid.

US intelligence identified a fake video, allegedly produced by Russian operatives, showing individuals falsely claiming to commit voter fraud in Georgia. Aimed at creating distrust in US elections, the video prompted Georgia's election chief to request its removal from social media platforms.

== Mutual perceptions by the countries' populations ==
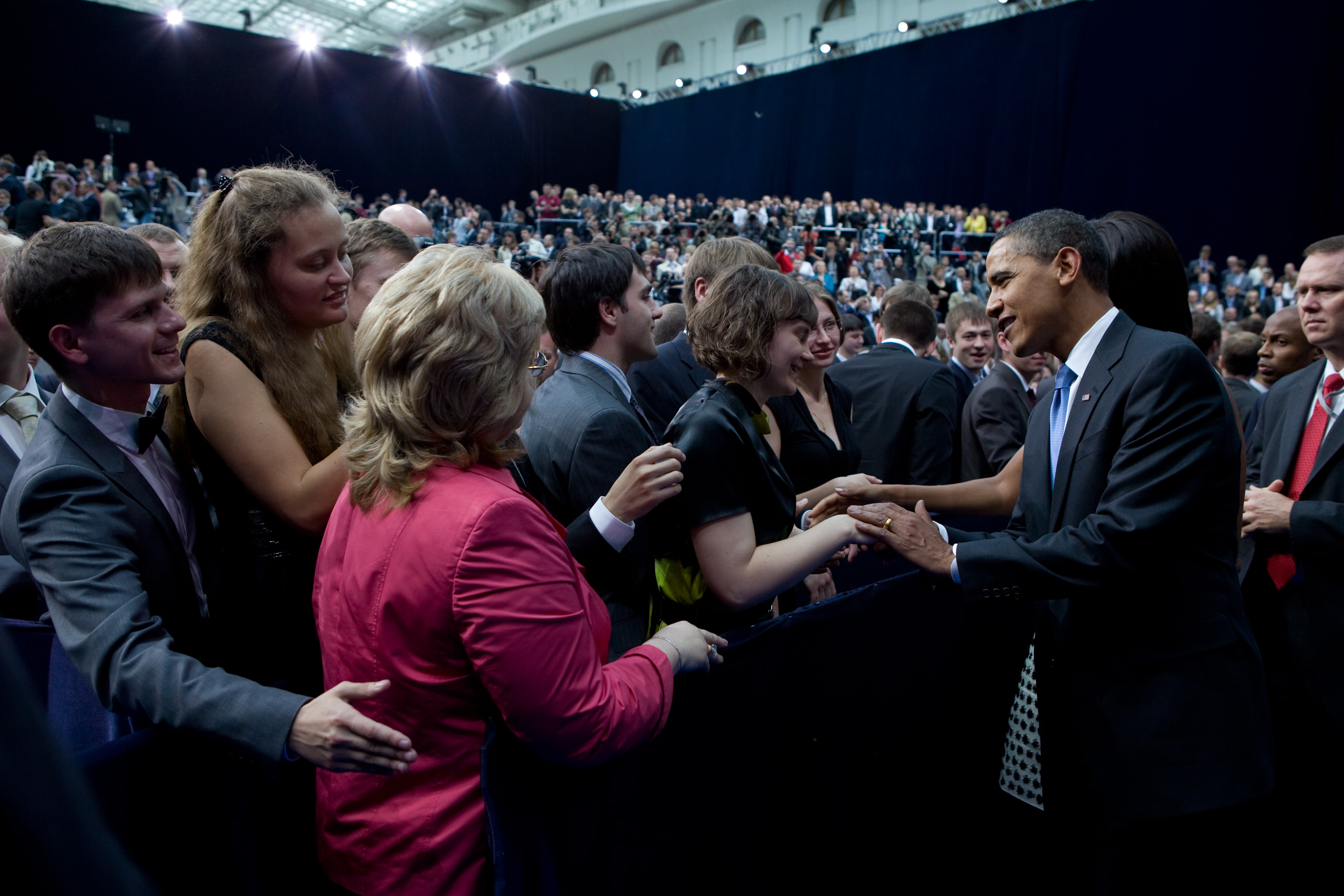
President Obama greets attendees at the New Economic School graduation in Gostinny Dvor, Moscow, July 7, 2009

A poll by the University of Maryland, College Park, released early July 2009 found that only 2 percent of Russians had "a lot of confidence" that U.S. president Barack Obama would do the right thing in world affairs. Russian media criticized the United States for pursuing an anti-missile system in Europe, for favoring NATO expansion and for supporting Georgia in its armed conflict with Russia in 2008.

Russians have criticized the United States over the past years for favoring NATO's eastward expansion.

Prior to 2014, the Russian press expressed varying opinions of Russia–United States relations. Russian media treatment of America ranged from doctrinaire and nationalistic to very positive toward the United States and the West. In 2013, 51 percent of Russians had a favorable view of the U.S., down from 57 percent in 2010.

The opinion polls taken by the independent Levada Center in January 2015, showed 81 percent of Russians tended to hold negative views of the U.S., a number that had nearly doubled over the previous 12 months and that was by far the highest negative rating since the center started tracking those views in 1988, as well as surpassing any time since the Stalin era, according to observers. This contrasts with only 7 percent of Russians in April 1990 who said they had bad or somewhat bad attitudes towards the U.S. Likewise, the figures published by Gallup in February 2015 showed a significant rise in anti-Russian sentiment in the U.S.: the proportion of Americans who considered Russia as a "critical military threat" had over the 12 months increased from 32 to 49 percent, and, for the first time in many years, Russia topped the list of America's perceived external enemies, ahead of North Korea, China and Iran, with 18 percent of U.S. residents putting Russia at the top of the list of the "United States' greatest enemy today". Public opinion polls taken by the Pew Research Center showed that favorable U.S. public opinion of Russia was at 22 percent in 2015. The most negative view of Russia was at 19 percent in 2014, and the most positive view at 49 percent in 2010 and 2011. The most negative view of the United States was at 15 percent in 2015, while the most positive view was at 61 percent in 2002.

US public opinion regarding Russia has changed substantially over the past 25 years. A Gallup poll from 1992 to 2017 shows 62% of American respondents having a favorable view of Russia in 1992, and 29% having an unfavorable view. In 2017, 70% of American respondents had an unfavorable view of Russia, and 28% had a favorable view. A February 2023 Gallup poll found that 9% of Americans have a favorable view of Russia, and 51% view the military power of Russia as a critical threat, though this is down significantly from 59% a year prior. A poll conducted by YouGov in 2015 found that only 11% of Americans believed that the Soviet Union contributed most to the defeat of Nazi Germany in World War II.

A 2017 survey conducted by the Pew Research Center showed 41% of Russians had a positive view of the US, only one of two countries surveyed where positive perception for the US increased; 52% expressed a negative view. The same study also showed 53% of Russians had confidence in the U.S. president Donald Trump, compared to just 11% for former president Barack Obama.

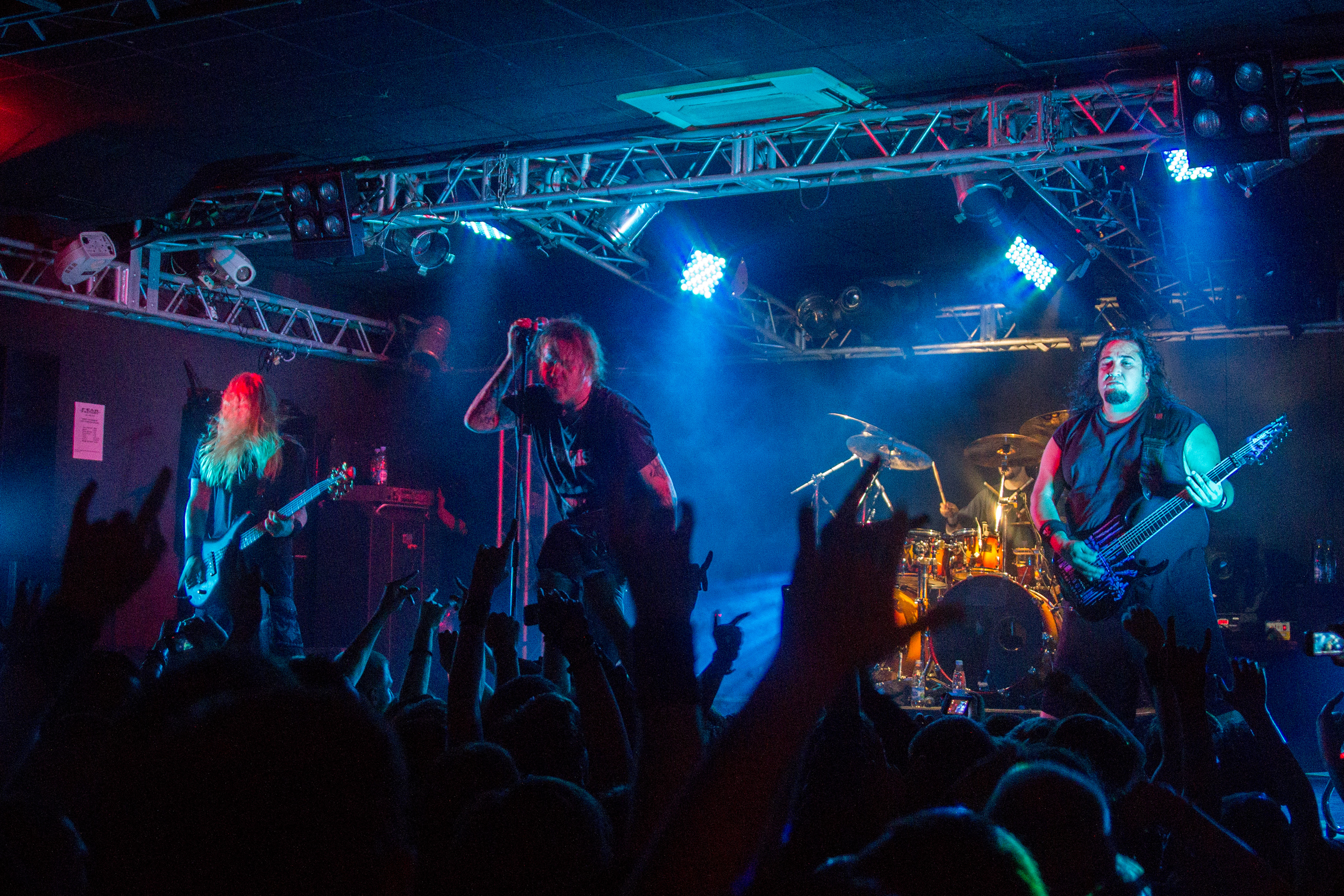
American metal band Fear Factory in Saint Petersburg.

There has also been a change in whether Americans view Russia as an ally or a threat. In 1992, 44% of American respondents saw Russia to be friendly but not an ally, and 5% see them as a threat. In 2014, the Gallup poll reports that 21% of Americans see Russia as friendly but not an ally, and 24% of American respondents seeing them as a threat. This difference in how Americans view Russia has been attributed to the increasing lack of cooperation in the scientific field between the US and Russia, by some. Another perspective is the shift from ally to threat is due to the US being critical of Russia's aggression, especially with their aggression towards geographic neighbors, the United States being one of those neighbors, as it shares a common sea border with the Russian Federation and the US State of Alaska.

The 2016 surveys independently conducted by the Chicago Council and Russia's Levada Center showed that mutual perceptions between Russians and Americans were at levels not seen since the Cold War, indicating considerable mutual distrust.

U.S.–Russian relations have further deteriorated since 2016. A December 2017 survey conducted by the Chicago Council and its Russian partner, the Levada Center, showed that:

Seventy-eight percent of Russians polled said the United States meddles "a great deal" or "a fair amount" in Russian politics, compared to 69 percent of Americans who say the same about Russian interference in U.S. politics. ... The poll found that 31 percent of Russians said Moscow tried to influence U.S. domestic affairs in a significant way, compared to 55 percent of Americans who felt that their own government tried to do the same thing in Russia. ... Only 31 percent of Americans say they hold a positive view of Russia, and 24 percent of Russians say the same of the United States. ... Eighty-one percent of Russians said they felt the United States was working to undermine Russia on the world stage; 77 percent of Americans said the same of Russia.

A Levada poll released in August 2018 found that 68% of Russian respondents believe that Russia needs to dramatically improve relations with the United States and other Western countries. According to The Moscow Times, "Russians increasingly view the United States in a positive light following a presidential" summit in Helsinki in July 2018. "For the first time since 2014, the number of Russians who said they had "positive" feelings towards the United States (42 percent) outweighed those who reported "negative" feelings (40 percent)."

The 2019 poll independently conducted by the Chicago Council and Levada Center found that 85% of Russians and 78% of Americans say the United States and Russia are "more rivals than partners." The president of the Center for Citizen Initiatives, Sharon Tennison, stated in 2019, "In my 35 years of traveling throughout Russia, I've never before witnessed such a vast gap between what average Americans 'believe' about Russia and Russia's reality on ground today."

A Levada poll released in February 2020 found that 80% of Russian respondents believe that Russia and the West should become friends and partners. However, only 42% of Russians polled said they had a positive view of the United States. Only 18% of Americans polled by Pew Research Center said they had a positive view of Russia. According to the Pew Research Center, "57% of Russians ages 18 to 29 see the U.S. favorably, compared with only 15% of Russians ages 50 and older." In 2019, only 20% of Russians viewed U.S. president Donald Trump positively. Only 14% of Russians expressed net approval of Donald Trump's foreign policies and actions.

A 2024 Gallup poll shows that twenty-six percent of Americans consider Russia to be the United States' greatest enemy today, ranking it as the second-largest known enemy of the United States after China. According to a 2026 Gallup poll, only 17% of Americans have favorable opinions of Russia, while 79% have an unfavorable opinion. This was the third most negative ranking Americans gave out of the 21 foreign countries surveyed.

=== Propaganda ===
- The U.S. government funds Radio Free Europe/Radio Liberty that broadcasts in 26 languages to many countries. The radio's broadcasting is viewed by Russian researchers as an instrument of American propaganda targeting Russia as a state. According to The Intercept, some American media have been accused of spreading anti-Russian propaganda."
- Russia funds Russia Today and Sputnik News which have been accused of pushing pro-Kremlin narratives internationally. In 2021, the Russian state media budget was 211 billion rubles (about $2.8 billion USD), an increase of 34 billion-ruble ($460 million USD) over previous years. According to a University of Oxford report, Moscow uses RT "to sow conspiracy theories to cast doubt on traditional media outlets" and "skewing news output to promote narratives that showed the West as corrupt, divided and out of touch." The influence operation also extends to US allies. RT and Sputnik were cited by the European Parliament's resolution of November 23, 2016, as the Russian government's tools of "propaganda against the EU and its North American partners" such as pushing narratives against democratic values and portraying eastern countries as failed states. The RT America network has employed Americans, including TV hosts and political commentators such as Larry King and Ed Schultz, to help them appear more like a legitimate outlet. Jim Rutenberg described them "wittingly or not... playing the equestrians to Russia's trojan horse."

== Timeline of relations between the United States and Russia ==
The timeline covers key events, 1991 to present.

=== Yeltsin era, 1991–99 ===
- 1991: U.S. president George H. W. Bush and USSR president Mikhail Gorbachev sign START I treaty, July 31.
- 1991: August: Soviet hardliners stage a coup against Gorbachev; they fail because of defiance by Russian president Boris Yeltsin. Communism collapses overnight in the USSR.
- 1991: Gorbachev announces the dissolution of the USSR into 15 independent republics; Russia is the successor state to the USSR.
- 1992: Russian president Yeltsin visits the U.S. on January 26. He and Bush set up the United States–Russia Joint Commission on P.O.W./M.I.A.'s. Its mission is to discover what happened to POWs and those missing in action during the Cold War, as well as planes shot down, missing submarines. The committee had access to classified archives from the FBI and the KGB.
- 1992: The Lisbon Protocol calls for the denuclearization of Ukraine, Belarus, Kazakhstan. May 23.
- 1992: Russia attends the Washington Summit on June 16.
- 1992: The United States and Russia sign an Agreement Concerning Cooperation in the Exploration and Use of Outer Space for Peaceful Purposes on June 17.
- 1993: Bush and Yeltsin sign the START II treaty in Moscow on January 3.
- 1993: First summit meeting between U.S. president Bill Clinton and Yeltsin on April 4 in Vancouver, Canada, to discuss a new and expanded $1 billion aid package intended to support Russian democrats and to fund medical supplies, food and grain assistance as well as loans to Russian entrepreneurs.
- 1993: The U.S. announces a bilateral aid program of $1.8 billion for Russia and the former Soviet republics on July 9 to 10.
- 1993: The U.S.–Russian Commission on technical cooperation in energy and space has its first meeting in Washington, D.C., on August 31 to September 2.
- 1994: Presidents Clinton and Yeltsin sign the Kremlin accords on January 14 in Moscow.
- 1994: First joint U.S.–Russia Space Shuttle mission on February 3.
- 1994: The United States and Russia move to end the practice of aiming their strategic nuclear missiles at each other on May 30.
- 1994: Russia joins the Partnership for Peace program on June 22.
- 1995: Presidents Clinton and Yeltsin hold a summit on European Security in Moscow on May 9 to 10.
- 1995: Russia joins the NATO-led IFOR in the aftermath of the Bosnian War on December 20.
- 1996: Ratification of START II treaty on January 26.
- 1996: Clinton and Yeltsin attend the Summit of the Peacemakers in Sharm al-Sheikh, Egypt to condemn the terrorist attacks in Israel and to declare their support for the Middle East peace process on March 14.
- 1996: Clinton attends a Summit on Nuclear Safety and Security with Yeltsin in Moscow on April 20.
- 1997: Russia joins the NATO-led Euro-Atlantic Partnership Council to cooperate on political and security issues on January 1.
- 1997: Clinton and Yeltsin hold another summit on European Security in Helsinki, Finland, on March 21. They reach some economic agreements, but there is continued disagreement on NATO expansion.
- 1997: April. Moscow summit with General Secretary of the Chinese Communist Party Jiang Zemin disapproves of American world domination; agree to reduce troops along Russia-China border.
- 1997: Russia attends the NATO summit in Paris, France, on May 27.
- 1997: The NATO-Russia Founding Act provides the formal basis of bilateral cooperation between the U.S., Russia and NATO is signed on May 27. Allows participation in NATO decision making; Russia agrees to drop opposition to NATO expansion in Central Europe.
- 1997: Russia joins the G8 at the 23rd G8 summit in Denver, Colorado, on June 20 to 22.
- 1998: Clinton and Yeltsin agree to exchange information on missile launchings and to remove 50 metric tons of plutonium from their countries' nuclear weapons stocks in a summit in Moscow on September 1 to 2.
- 1999: Russia joins the NATO-led KFOR in the aftermath of the Kosovo War on June 12.
- 1999: March: Operation Allied Force: NATO bombing of Yugoslavia to force it out of Kosovo. Moscow attacked it as a breach of international law and a challenge to Russia's status in the Balkans.
- 1999: Clinton and Yeltsin meet at an Organization for Security Cooperation in Europe Summit Meeting in Istanbul, Turkey, from November 18–19, to discuss arms control, Chechnya and events in Europe. Clinton remarks that the international community does not dispute Russia's right to defend its territorial integrity and to fight terrorism.

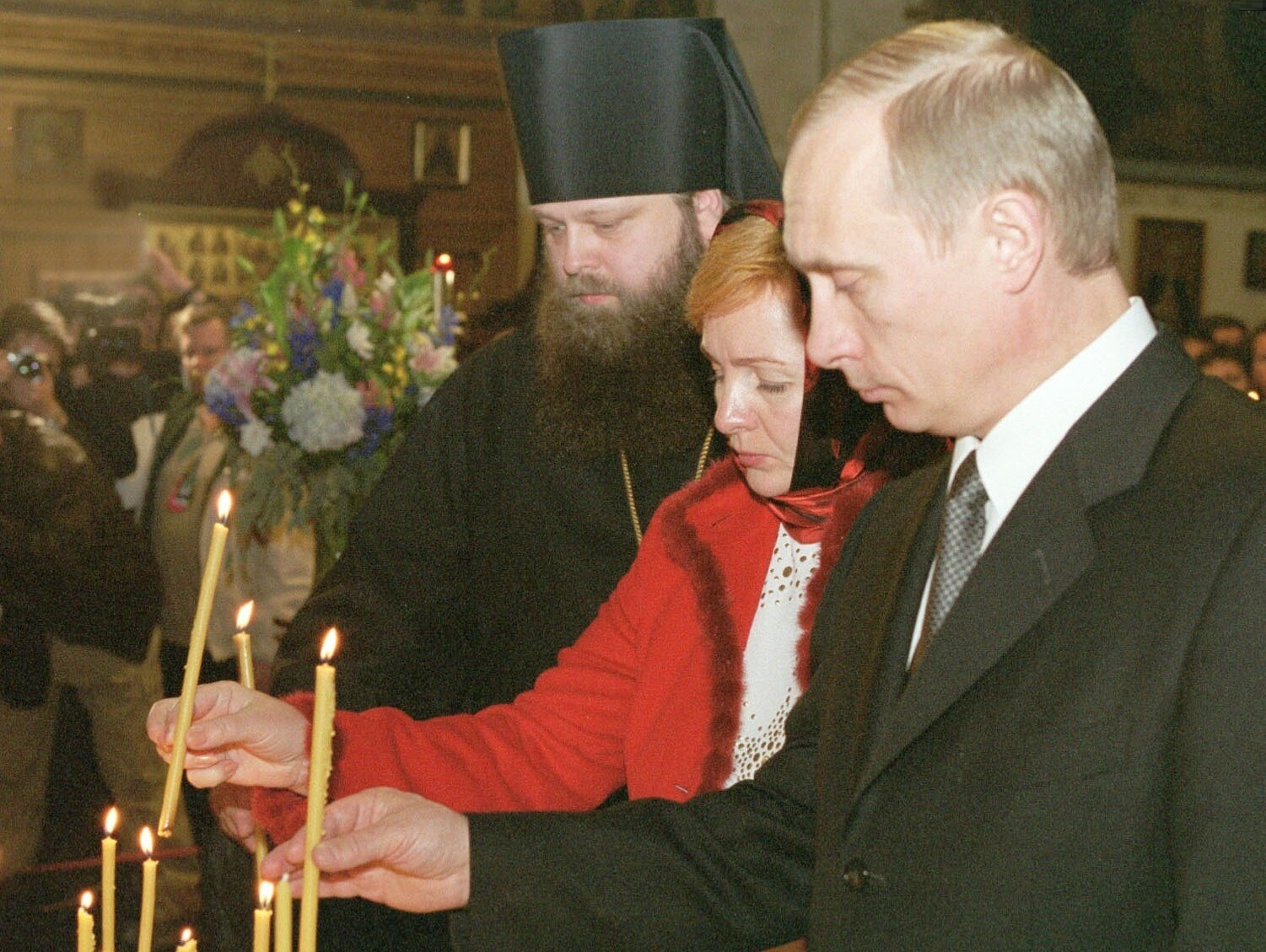
Vladimir Putin and wife Lyudmila at service for victims of the September 11 attacks, November 16, 2001.

=== Putin era, 2000–present ===
- 2000: Clinton visits Moscow to meet with new Russian president Vladimir Putin on June 3 to 5.
- 2000: Clinton and Putin meet at the United Nations Millennium Summit in New York City to call a plea for world peace on September 6.
- 2001: President George W. Bush has a very friendly meeting with Putin at the Slovenia summit on June 16. At the closing press conference, Bush said: "I looked the man in the eye. I found him very straightforward and trustworthy – I was able to get a sense of his soul." Bush's top security aide Condoleezza Rice realized that Bush's phrasing had been a serious mistake. "We were never able to escape the perception that the president had naïvely trusted Putin and then been betrayed."
- 2001: Russia supports the U.S. in the aftermath of the September 11 attacks on September 12.
- 2001: Russia opens a military hospital in Kabul, Afghanistan, to help the NATO military forces and Afghan civilians on December 2.
- 2002: Bush and Putin meet in Moscow and sign the Strategic Offensive Reductions Treaty and declaration on a new strategic relationship between the U.S. and Russia on May 24.
- 2002: NATO and Russia create the NATO-Russia Council during Rome summit on May 28.
- 2003: The "Roadmap for Peace" proposal developed by the U.S. in cooperation with Russia, the European Union, and the United Nations (the Quartet), was presented to Israel and the Palestinian Authority on April 30.
- 2003: Russia strongly condemns the United States in the lead-up to the 2003 invasion of Iraq, and calls for a peaceful solution to the crisis.
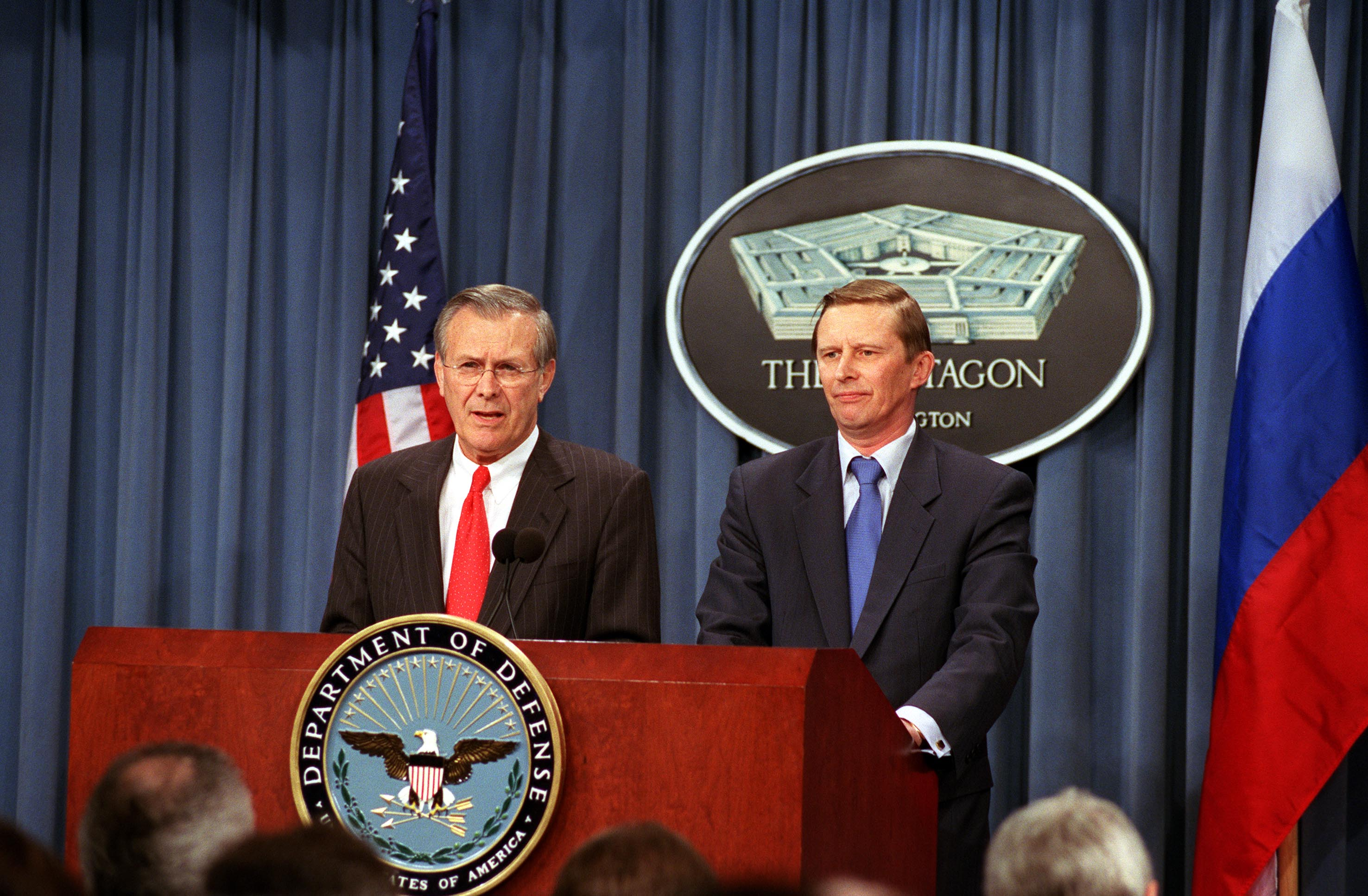
  Donald Rumsfeld with Russian Minister of Defense Sergei Ivanov on March 13, 2002
- 2004: Bush gives condolences to Putin in the aftermath of the Beslan school hostage crisis on September 21.
- 2006: Bush and Putin jointly announced the organization of the Global Initiative to Combat Nuclear Terrorism on July 16.
- 2006: The U.S. and Russia condemn North Korea's first nuclear launch test on October 6.
- 2008: Russian president Dmitry Medvedev visits the U.S. for the first time at the 2008 G-20 summit in Washington, D.C., from November 14 to 15.
- 2009: February: US vice president Joe Biden suggests the new Obama administration would like to "reset" America's relationship with Russia, which had deteriorated to its lowest point since the Cold War after Russia's war with Georgia in 2008.
- 2009: Newly elected president Barack Obama and Medvedev meet for the first time at the G-20 Summit in London on April 1; they pledge to "deepen cooperation" on issues like nuclear terrorism.
- 2009: The U.S. and Russia disapprove the nuclear test by North Korea on May 25.
- 2009: Obama and Medvedev announce the Obama–Medvedev Commission to improve communication and cooperation between the U.S. and Russia in Moscow on July 6.
- 2009: U.S. chairman of the Joint Chiefs of Staff Admiral Michael Mullen and Russian chief of the general staff Nikolay Makarov sign a new strategic framework for military-to-military engagement between the U.S. and Russia on July 7.
- 2009: Obama administration cancels the eastern European missile defense program denounced by Russia.
- 2009: Russia agrees to allow U.S. and NATO troops and supplies to pass through Russia en route to Afghanistan on December 16.
- 2010: Obama and Medvedev sign New START treaty in Prague, Czech Republic, to replace the START I and it will eventually see the reduction of both nations' nuclear arsenals to 1,500 warheads for both the U.S. and Russia on April 8.
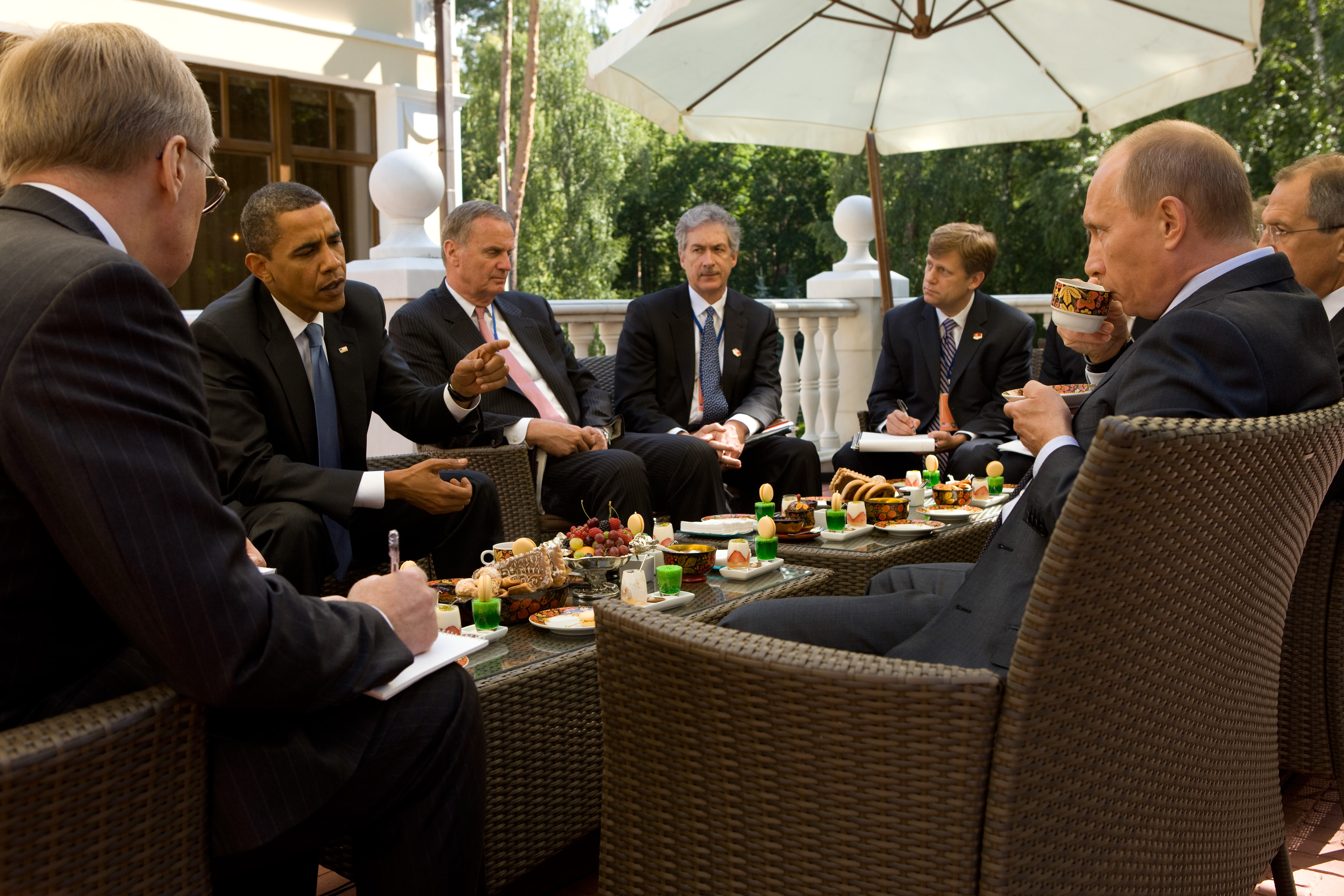
  Barack Obama meets with Prime Minister Putin outside Moscow, July 7, 2009
- 2010: The U.S. and Russia call for Iran to give up on its nuclear weapons program along with the United Kingdom, France and China on June 9.
- 2010: Obama and Medvedev sign the "New START" (New Strategic Arms Reduction Treaty). Goal is to reduce the deployed nuclear warheads on both sides by roughly 30 percent, down to 1,550. The treaty also limits the number of nuclear-armed submarines and bombers. New START went into force in February 2011.
- 2010: The U.S. and Russia conduct a joint anti-hijacking exercise called Vigilant Eagle-2010 on August 14.
- 2010: Foreign ministers from the U.S., Russia and NATO meet in New York to discuss areas of cooperation like Afghanistan, fighting piracy and combatting terrorism as well as ways of enhancing security within Europe on September 22.
- 2010: Medvedev attends the 2010 NATO summit in Portugal, from November 19 to 20. The U.S., Russia and NATO agree to cooperate on missile defense and other security issues as well as allowing more supplies for the U.S. and NATO to pass through Russia en route to Afghanistan as well as supplying Afghan armed forces with helicopters.
- 2011: The New START treaty is ratified in Munich, Germany, by U.S. secretary of state Hillary Clinton and Russian foreign minister Sergey Lavrov on February 5.
- 2011: Ministers from the U.S., Russia and NATO meet in Berlin, Germany to discuss the situation in Libya and Afghanistan, as well as ongoing work on outlining the future framework for missile defence cooperation between the U.S., Russia and NATO on April 15.
- 2011: Russia congratulates the U.S. on the killing of Osama bin Laden on May 2.
- 2011–present: Syrian Civil War; the government receives technical, financial, military and political support from Russia, while the U.S. favors some of the rebels. Russia provides diplomatic support in the United Nations as well. Russia has an interest in a military presence in the region, and in suppressing its own Muslim militants. It also rejects regime change imposed by the West.
- 2011: American, Russian and NATO ambassadors meet in Sochi, Russia, to restate their commitment to pursuing cooperation on missile defense as well as cooperation in other security areas of common interest on July 4.
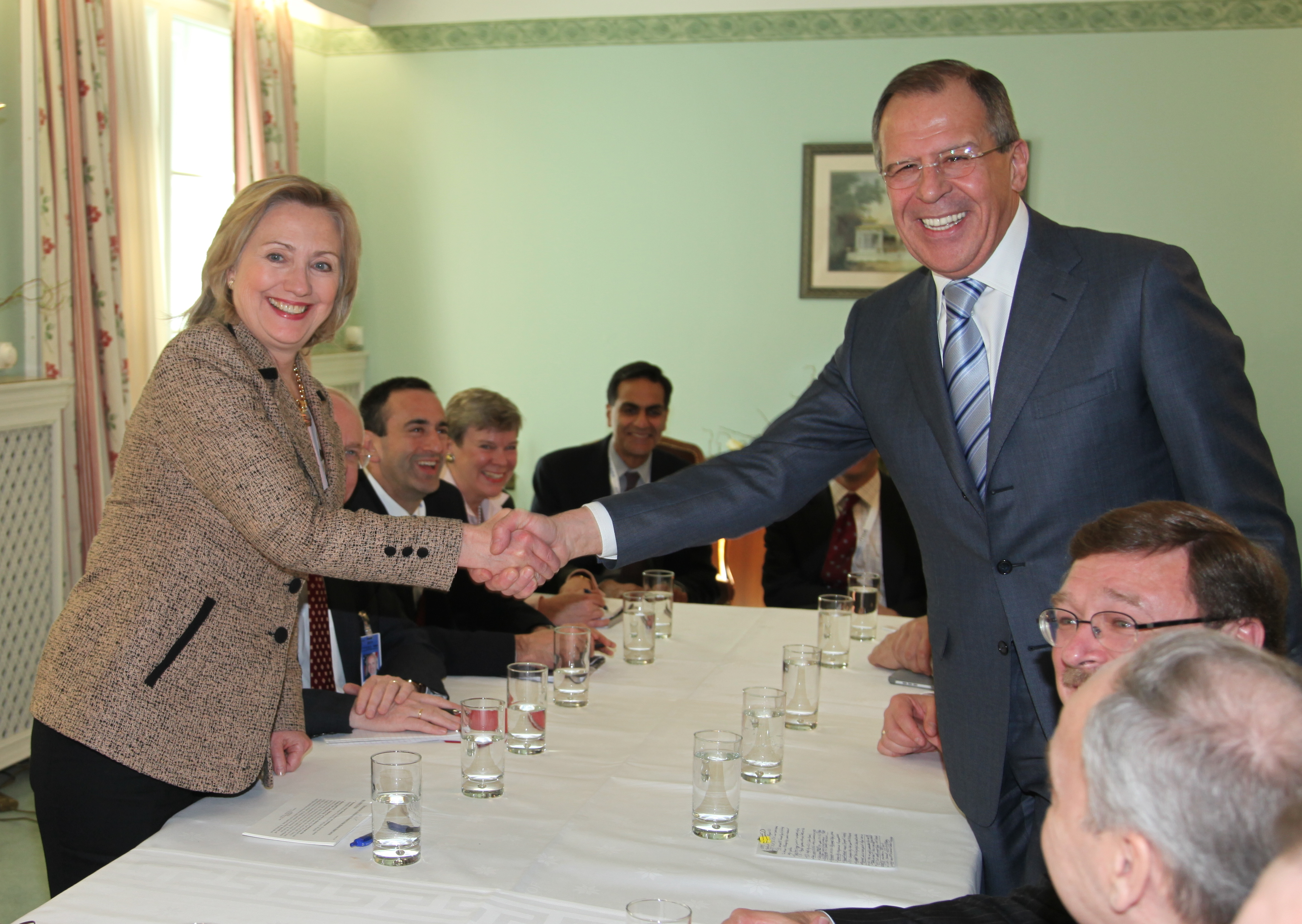
  U.S. secretary of state Hillary Clinton and Russian foreign minister Sergey Lavrov shake hands after signing the New START Treaty, Munich, Germany, on February 5, 2011
- 2011: American, Russian and NATO diplomats meet in New York to announce they have made progress in combating terrorism and enhancing Afghan transit on September 22.
- 2012: Russia agrees to host a U.S. and NATO transit hub at Ulyanovsk airport to help the U.S. and NATO withdrawal from Afghanistan in 2014 on March 21.
- 2012: Obama and Medvedev meet at the 2012 Nuclear Security Summit in Seoul to discuss the increase economic trade on March 26.
- 2012: The U.S., Russia and NATO hold missile defense exercises in Germany, from March 26 to 30.
- 2012: American, Russian and NATO military forces agree to strengthen cooperation to counter piracy in the Horn of Africa on March 27.
- 2012: Russian prime minister Dmitry Medvedev attends the 38th G8 summit in Maryland, from May 18 to 19.
- 2012: Russia joins the U.S. and NATO at the Chicago Summit on May 20.
- 2012: Obama and Putin meet at the 7th G-20 meeting in Los Cabos, Mexico, and call for an end to the Syrian civil war on June 18 to 19.
- 2012: American and Russian navies participate in the RIMPAC 2012 naval exercises from June 29 to August 3.
- 2012: Russia joins the WTO and begins trade with the U.S. on August 22.
- 2013: Russia supports the U.S. against North Korea for North Korea building up tensions in the Korean peninsula and for threatening the U.S. during the crisis with North Korea on April 8.
- 2013: The U.S. and Russia agree to intensify their cooperation in countering terrorism, including information exchange between intelligence organizations and conduct joint counter-terrorist operations as well as signing a cyber security pact to reduce the risk of conflict in cyberspace and signing the New Anti-Proliferation Deal in order to protect, control and account for nuclear materials on June 17 during the 39th G8 summit.
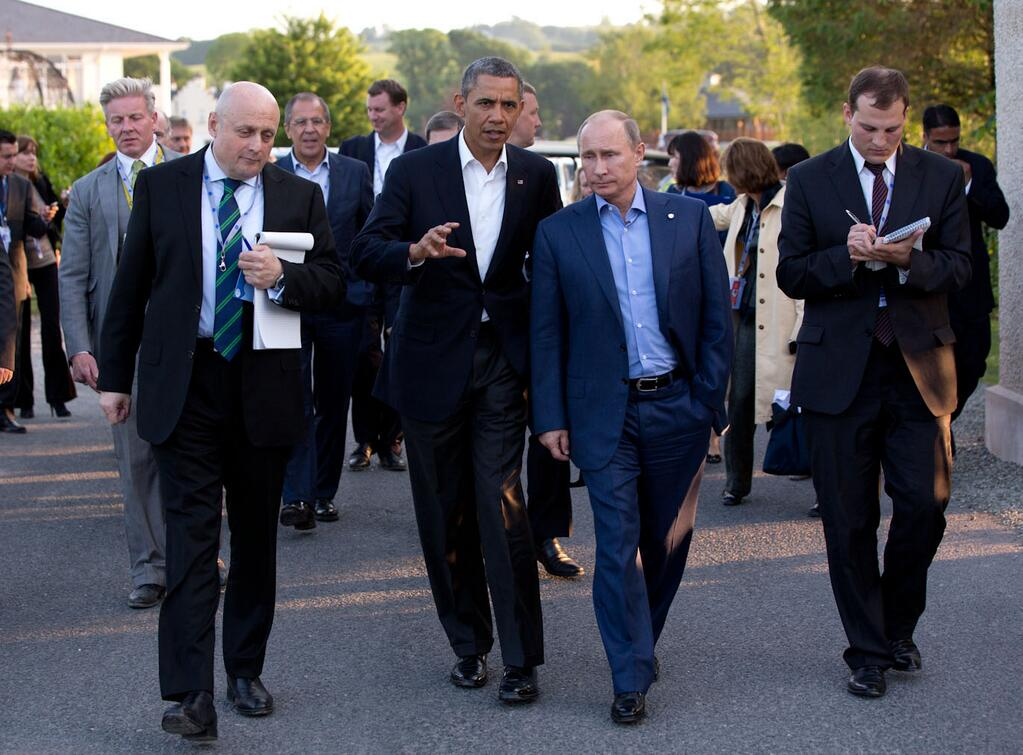
  Obama at a bilateral meeting with Putin during the G8 summit in Ireland, June 17, 2013.

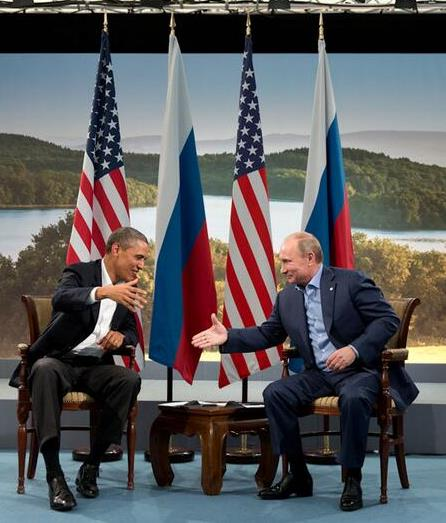
Putin and Obama shake hands at G8 summit, June 17, 2013

- 2013 August 7. President Obama cancels an upcoming summit with Putin; journalists call it "a rare, deliberate snub that reflects the fresh damage done by the Edward Snowden case to an important relationship already in decline."
- 2013: Obama and Putin make progress on the discussion of Syria at the end of the 2013 G-20 summit in Saint Petersburg, Russia, on September 6.
- 2013: U.S. secretary of state John Kerry and Russian foreign minister Sergey Lavrov meet in Geneva, Switzerland, and agree to secure and destroy Syria's chemical weapons on September 14.
- 2013: The U.S. and Russia along with the United Kingdom, France, China and Germany sign a deal with Iran about their nuclear program in Geneva, Switzerland, on November 27.
- 2014: The Geneva II Conference
- 2014: The U.S. Olympics team arrives in Sochi, Russia, to participate in the 2014 Winter Olympics on January 30.
- 2014 – Continuing. see Russian military intervention in Ukraine (2014–present)
- 2014: The U.S. and Russia along with the European Union and Ukraine talk in Geneva about the crisis in Ukraine and reach an agreement to end the crisis on April 17.
- 2014: The U.S. and Russia start sending aid to Iraq to help fight ISIS on June 5.
- 2015: The U.S. and Russia along with members of the European Union and Ukraine welcome the new Minsk agreement to stop the war in Donbas in Donbas on February 12.
- 2015: The U.S. and Russia agree to build a new space station to replace the International Space Station and to make a joint project to travel to Mars on March 28.
- 2015: The U.S. and Russia along with the United Kingdom, France, China, Germany, the European Union and Iran sign the Joint Comprehensive Plan of Action to regulate Iran's nuclear program in Vienna, Austria on July 14.
- 2015: The U.S. and Russia reach an agreement on a UN resolution that would designate accountability for use of chemical weapons in Syria on August 6.
- 2015: The U.S. and Russia resume military relations to increase fighting against the Islamic State on September 18.
- 2015: Obama and Putin meet in New York to discuss ways to combat the Islamic State on September 28–29.
- 2015: The U.S. and Russia sign a deal to avoid air incidents over Syria on October 20.
- 2015: Obama and Putin have an informal bilateral meeting on the sidelines of the G-20 Summit in Turkey to discuss the situation in Syria and the ramifications of the Paris attacks on November 15.
- 2015: The U.S., Russia and the United Nations hold three way talks on Syria in Geneva, Switzerland on December 11.
- 2015: The U.S. and Russia, along with the United Nations approve a resolution that supports international efforts to seek a solution to end the Syrian Civil War and provide a new government in Syria in Vienna, Austria on December 18.
- 2016 June: A debate opens inside the Republican Party on future American policy toward Russia. The presumptive presidential nominee Donald Trump suggests that US and Russia might work together in areas such as Syria. Meanwhile, on June 9, Republican leaders in Congress urged confronting Putin, alleging that he is exhibiting "burgeoning militarism" and calling for "standing up to Russian aggression and bolstering countries such as Ukraine."
- 2016 November: Donald Trump wins the US presidential election.
- 2017 April: According to Trump, US ties with Russia may be at all-time low following US missile strike on Syria.
- 2017 July: During a speech in Warsaw, Poland, Trump warned Russia to stop its "destabilizing" actions in Ukraine and elsewhere, and its support for "hostile regimes" such as those in Syria and Iran. He also urged Russia to "join the community of responsible nations".
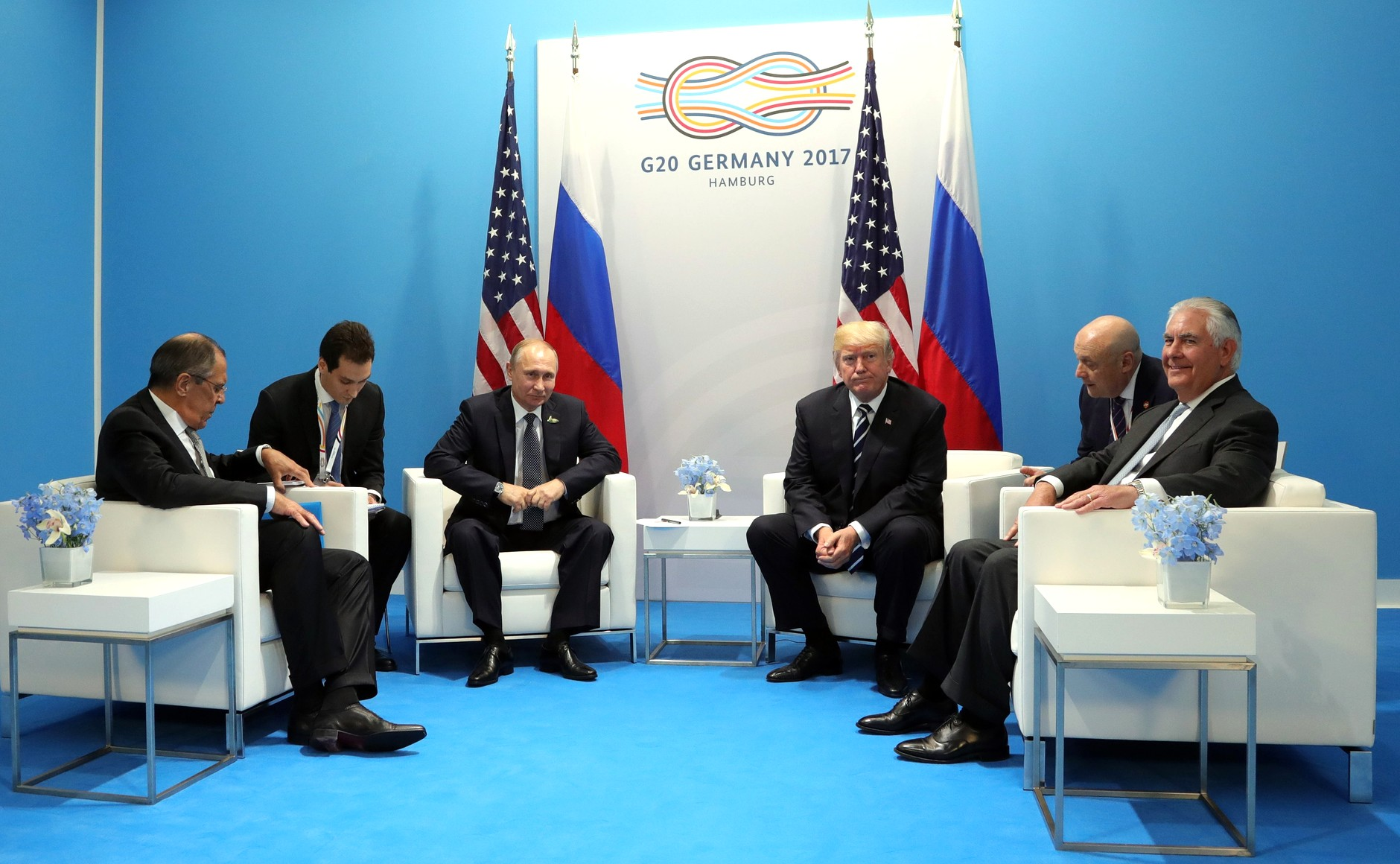
  U.S. president Donald Trump, Russian president Vladimir Putin, Rex Tillerson, and Sergey Lavrov at the G20 Hamburg summit, July 7, 2017
- 2017 July: Trump and Putin held a meeting for more than a two-hour period at the G20 Summit in Hamburg. Secretary of State Rex Tillerson said that Trump brought up discussion about Russia's alleged interference in the 2016 US presidential election.
- 2018 July 16: Russia–United States summit between Trump and Putin took place in Helsinki, Finland. Topics of discussion included the situation in Syria, the Ukrainian crisis and nuclear arms control.
- 2021 June 16: Russia–United States summit between Biden and Putin took place in Geneva, Switzerland.
- 2021 November 19: the congressmen calling on the U.S. not to recognize Vladimir Putin as president of Russia beyond 2024. Kremlin denounced it as an attempt to meddle in its domestic affairs.
- 2022 January 24: the U.S. sent 5000-8500 troops to Eastern Europe, to assist Ukraine against a potential renewed invasion by Russia.
- 2022 February 24: Russia invades Ukraine.
- 2022 December 17: Russia and the United States agreed to do a prisoner exchange. Russian arms dealer Viktor Bout and American basketball player Brittney Griner were swapped.
- 2023 April 27: US imposed sanctions on Russia & Iran for wrongful detention and hostage-taking of U.S. citizens abroad.
- 2025 February 18: Riyadh meeting with Rubio, Waltz, and Witkoff on the American side, and Lavrov and Presidential Aide Yuri Ushakov on the Russian side.
- 2025 February 28: Diplomats of both sides met in Istanbul on restoring regular operations at their diplomatic missions and possible continuation of direct flights between two countries.
- 2025 August 15: President Trump and President Putin met on August 15 in Alaska to discuss the Ukraine-Russia war.
- 2025 November: President Trump and President Putin plan to meet in November in Hungary to discuss the Ukraine-Russia war, the summit is later cancelled.
- 2026 February–March: Relations between US and Russia deteriorated again after the massive attack on Iran, which led to Ali Khamenei's death.
- 2026 October: Negotiations for a United States–Russia oil deal, a proposed sale of Russian energy assets, including foreign assets of Russian energy company Lukoil, to an investment group, as part of a proposed Ukraine peace deal.

== Space exploration ==
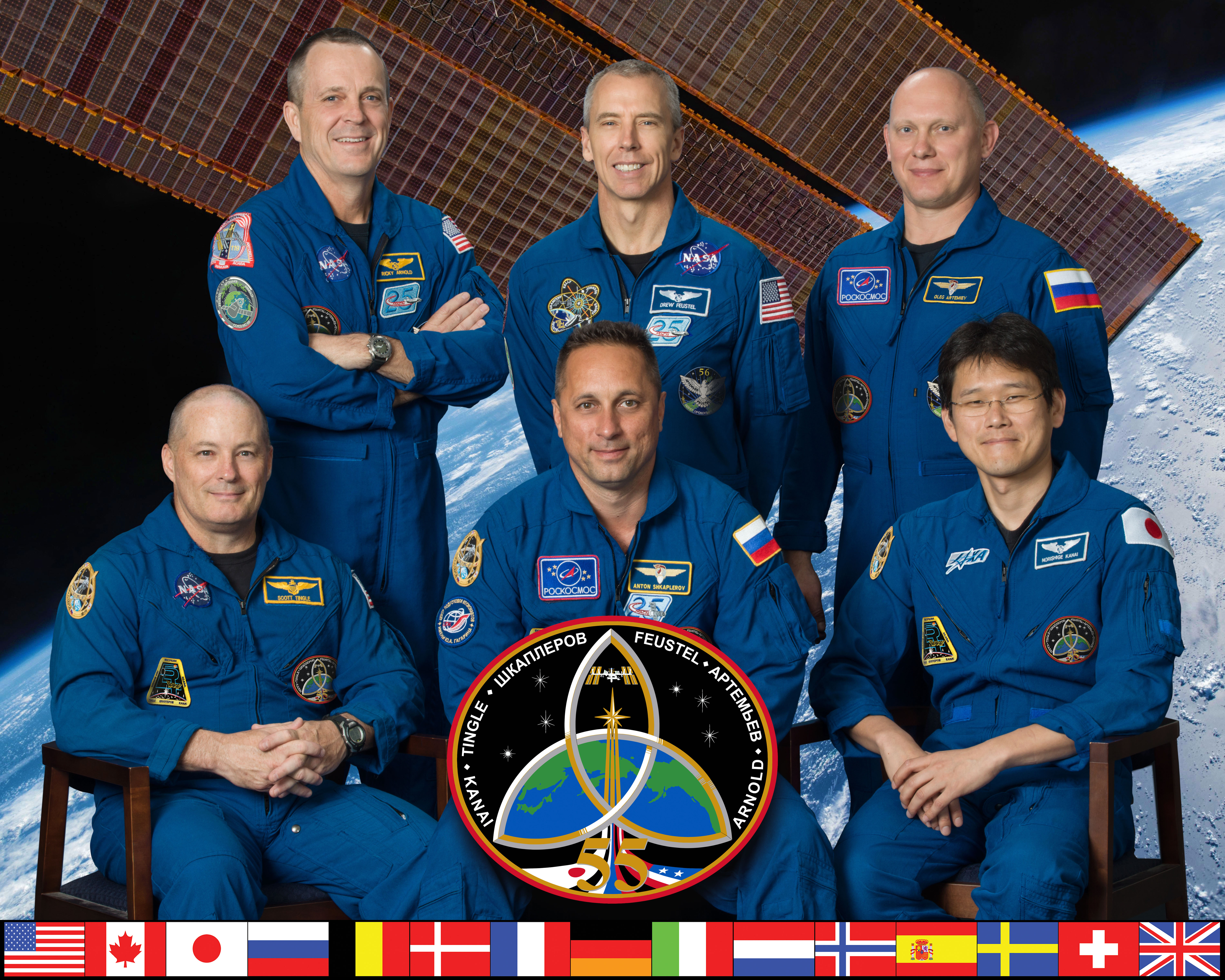
The 55th expedition to the International Space Station in February 2018

The Planetary Society is known to have collaborated with Russia, especially Cosmos 1 and LIFE.

In 2014, NASA renewed a contract to ferry U.S. astronauts to the International Space Station on Soyuz rockets and spacecraft. Including additional support at the Russian launch site, this contract is costing the United States $457.9 million. Along with the renewal, NASA also announced that they would be cutting some contacts with Russia after the annexation of Crimea.

In June 2021, NASA administrator Bill Nelson told CNN Business' Rachel Crane about the future of U.S.–Russian cooperation in the International Space Station (ISS): "For decades, upwards now of 45 plus years [we've cooperated with] Russians in space, and I want that cooperation to continue. Your politics can be hitting heads on Earth, while you are cooperating" in space.

== Nuclear arms race ==
In 1995, a Black Brant sounding rocket launched from the Andøya Space Center caused a high alert in Russia, known as the Norwegian rocket incident. The Russians thought it might be a nuclear missile launched from an American submarine. The incident occurred in the post-Cold War era, where many Russians were still very suspicious of the United States and NATO. The Norwegian rocket incident was the first and thus far only known incident where any nuclear-weapons state had its nuclear briefcase activated and prepared for launching an attack.

President Donald Trump announced on October 20, 2018, that the U.S. would no longer consider itself bound by the 1987 INF Treaty's provisions, raising nuclear tensions between the two powers. Two days later, Russian military analyst Pavel Felgenhauer told Deutsche Welle that the new Cold War would make this treaty and other Cold War-era treaties "irrelevant because they correspond to a totally different world situation." In early 2019, more than 90% of world's 13,865 nuclear weapons were owned by Russia and the United States.

President Putin oversaw Russia's large-scale nuclear war exercises on October 17, 2019, where the Russian army integrated land, sea and air components of the nation's nuclear triad, nearly one year after Trump announced that the US was pulling-out of the nuclear treaty it had signed with Russia.

According to a peer-reviewed study published in the journal Nature Food in August 2022, a full-scale nuclear war between the U.S. and Russia, which together hold more than 90% of the world's nuclear weapons, would kill 360 million people directly and more than 5 billion indirectly from starvation during a nuclear winter.

After the U.S. president announced plans to resume nuclear testing in October 2025, the Russian government responded cautiously. The Kremlin stated that Russia had not conducted any nuclear tests and had not yet decided to do so. The Russian Defense Minister also indicated that if other countries resumed nuclear testing, Russia would take similar measures. These statements reflect the context of bilateral relations and nuclear competition between the two countries, highlighting the emphasis both sides place on reciprocal actions in nuclear deterrence.

== Economic ties ==
The U.S. Congress repealed the Jackson–Vanik amendment on November 16, 2012.

"Last year [2015] was not particularly favorable for trade between Russia and the U.S. Our overall 2015 turnover was $21 billion, a decline of 27.9 percent," said a senior Russian official in April 2016.

Reuters reported that U.S. companies "generated more than $90 billion in revenue from Russia in 2017." According to the AALEP, "there are almost 3,000 American companies in Russia, and the U.S. is also the leader in terms of foreign companies in Special Economic Zones, with 11 projects."

A congressional report stated that "[e]ven before U.S.-Russia economic ties were constrained in the aftermath of Russia's annexation of Crimea in 2014 and its support for Donbas separatists, neither side had traditionally engaged in significant levels of bilateral trade and investment." The U.S. goods and services trade deficit with Russia was $11.2 billion in 2022. The total volume of trade between the two countries has fallen yearly since the 2022 Russian invasion of Ukraine, going from $36 billion in 2021, to $16.1 billion in 2022, to $5.1 billion in 2023, to $3.5 billion in 2024.

The following chart shows dollar figures from the US Census Bureau's Trade in Goods with Russia page:

- Imports from Russia to the US
- Exports from the US to Russia

On July 28, 2025, former Russian president Dmitry Medvedev warned that U.S. President Trump's ultimatum, threatening tariffs and sanctions if Russia didn't agree to a ceasefire within 10–12 days, could trigger a wider war. In 2026, Russia's economic envoy Kirill Dmitriev proposed an economic reintegration package which the Kremlin variously claimed to be worth $12 trillion, then $14 trillion, despite Russia's 2025 GDP being only $2.59 trillion USD. Policy analysts in America described the deal as "a losing proposition" based on Russia's economic situation and the security environment.

=== Imports from Russia to the US ===
One major import is enriched uranium. As of 2023, 24% of enriched uranium in the US is imported from Russia.

Another major import is gasoline, of which Russia the top provider in 2021. During the period 2003-2023 (inclusive), the low-point was December 2003.

=== Exports from the US to Russia ===
In 2023, the Congressional Research Service reported that the US was the third largest source of goods imports to Russia in 2021.

In March 2022, following the Russian invasion of Ukraine, exports from the US to Russia fell dramatically.

== Military ties ==
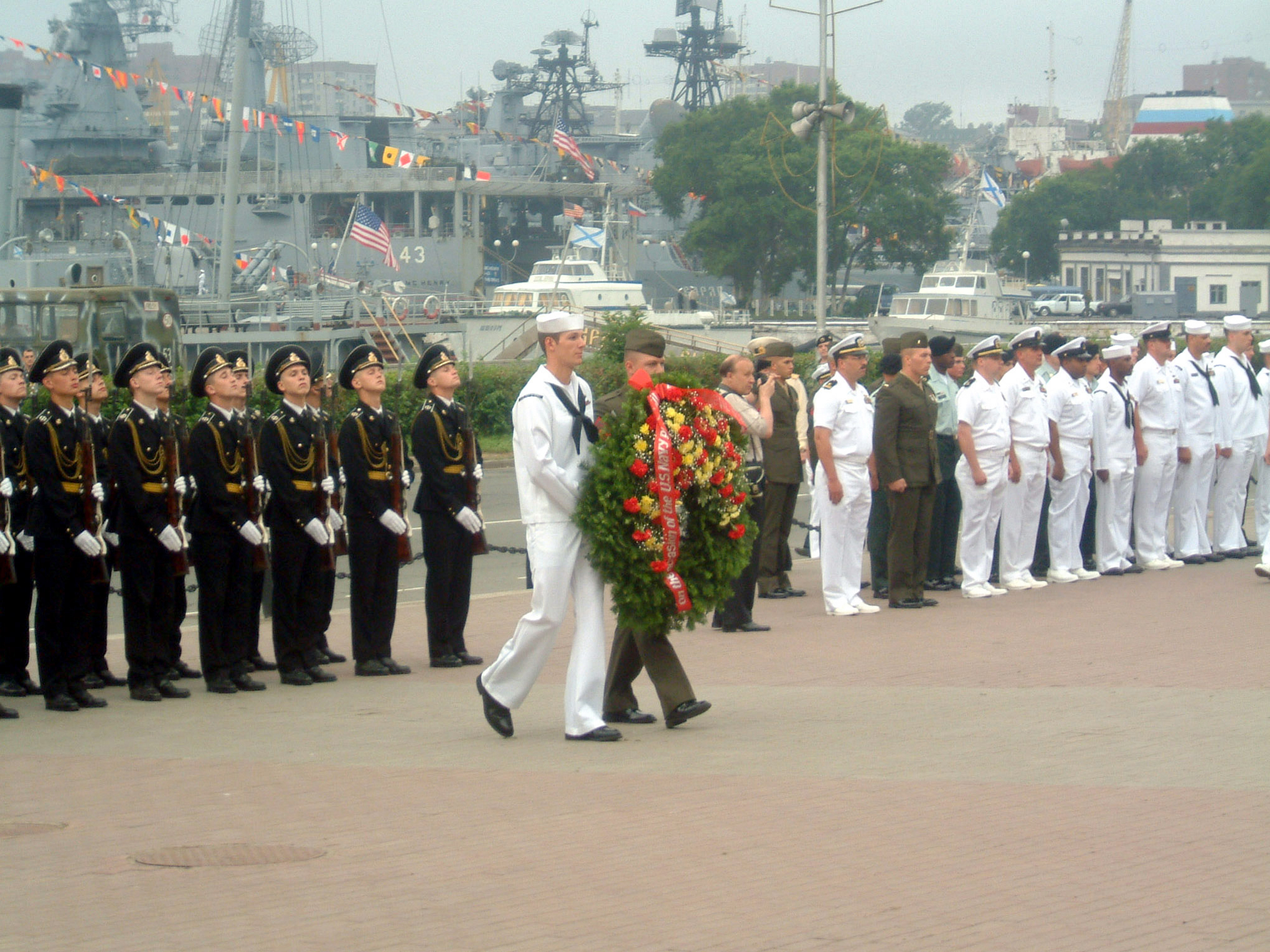
Russian and U.S. sailors honoring military personnel who perished during World War II, Vladivostok, Russia, July 4, 2002

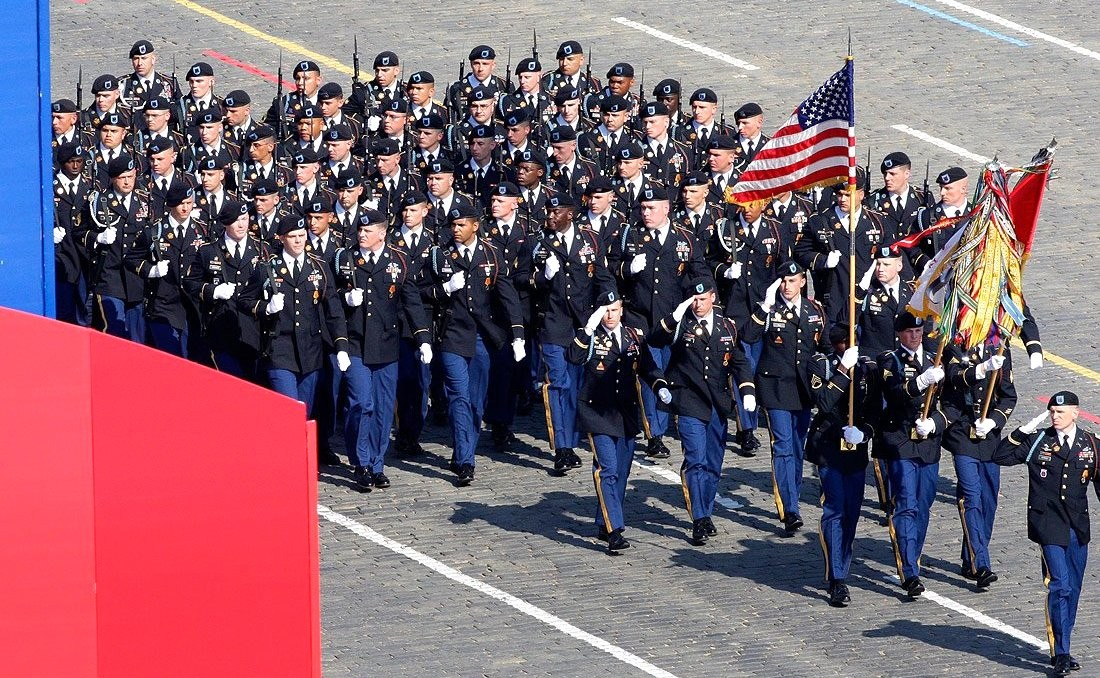
An element of the 18th Infantry Regiment, representing the United States at the 2010 Victory Day military parade in Moscow.

Following the demise of the Soviet Union, the United States and Russia signed a bilateral treaty called the Strategic Arms Reduction Treaty (START II), signed by George H. W. Bush and Boris Yeltsin.

The United States and Russia have conducted joint military maneuvers, training and counter-terrorist exercises in Germany. This was done in hopes to strengthen relations with the United States and Russia. The Russian president also proposed that the United States and Russia put a joint missile defense system in Azerbaijan, a proposal being considered by the United States. In 2008, in response to tensions over Georgia, the United States had cancelled its most recent joint NATO-Russia military exercises.

As of August 2013, the U.S. and Russia continue to hold joint military exercises like Northern Eagle (held since 2004, together with Norway) and Vigilant/Watchful Eagle (with Canada) among others, with the aim of improving joint cooperation against terrorism and piracy.

=== Russia–NATO relations ===
Russia-U.S. relations are significantly influenced by the United States' leading role in NATO and policies thereof. NATO and Russia agreed to cooperate on security issues at the 2002 Rome summit and had been gradually improving relations. However, due to the expansion of the alliance, the Russian intervention in Georgia, Russia's war campaign against Ukraine and other controversies, relations have since deteriorated significantly.

In May 2015, following increased tensions with NATO, Russia closed a key military transport corridor (the Northern Distribution Network), which had allowed NATO to deliver military supplies to Afghanistan through the Russian territory. The Northern Distribution Network was established in 2010 in response to the increased risk of sending supplies through Pakistan.

A June 2016 Levada poll found that 69% of Russians think that deploying NATO troops in the Baltic states and Poland – former Eastern bloc countries bordering Russia – is a threat to Russia.

=== Joint operations and mutual support ===
Russia expressed support for the United States' war on terror. Russia also agreed to provide logistic support for the United States forces in Afghanistan to aid in anti-terrorist operations. Russia allowed U.S. and NATO forces to pass through its territory to go to Afghanistan. In 2017, the former Deputy Secretary of State Antony Blinken said: "We cooperated with regard to Afghanistan, where Russia played a positive role, particularly in letting our forces and our equipment transit into and out of Afghanistan."

== Resident diplomatic missions ==
of Russia in the United States

- Washington, D.C. (Embassy)
- Houston (Consulate-General)
- New York City (Consulate-General)

of the United States in Russia

- Moscow (Embassy)

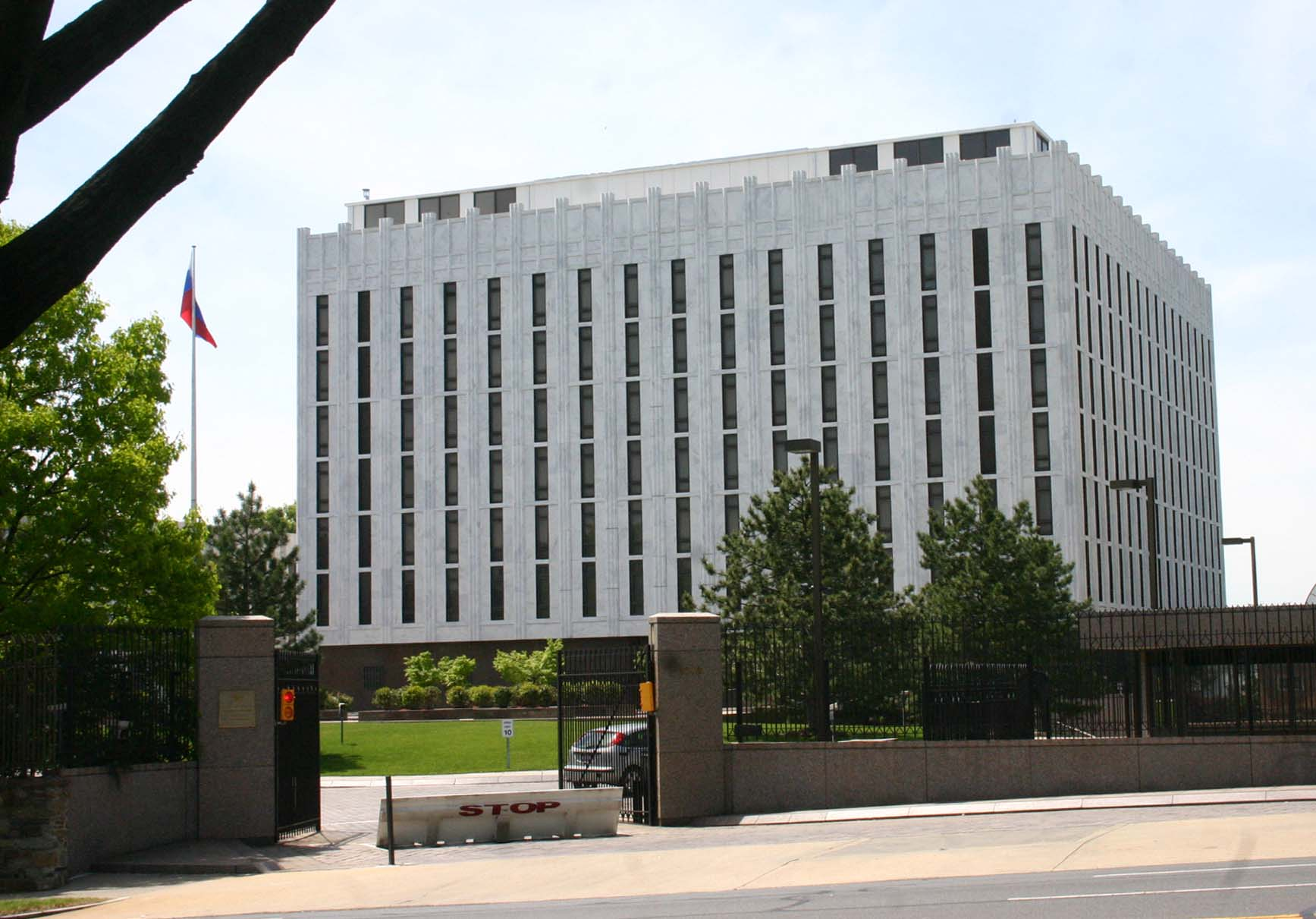
Embassy of Russia in Washington, D.C.

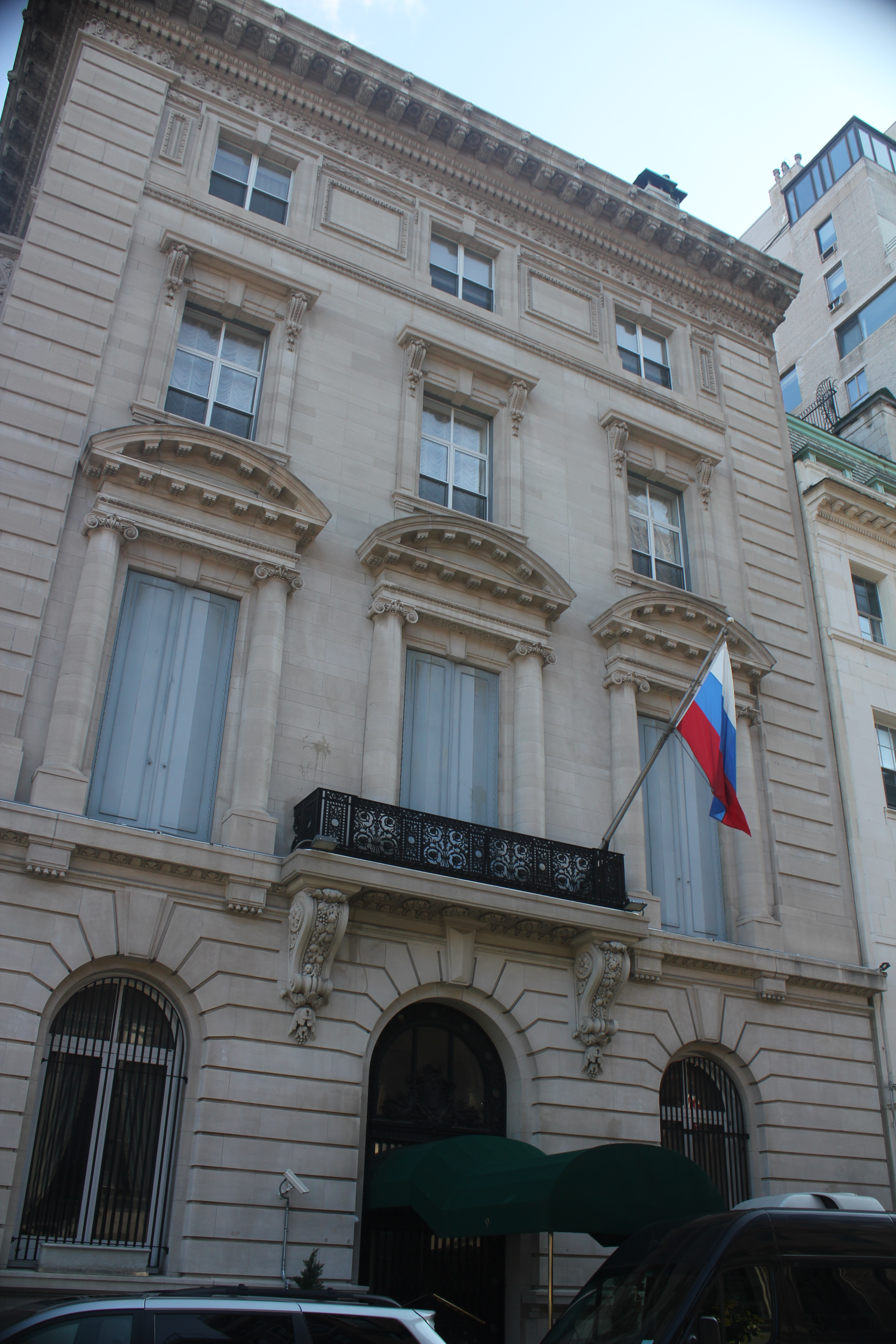
Consulate-General of Russia in New York City

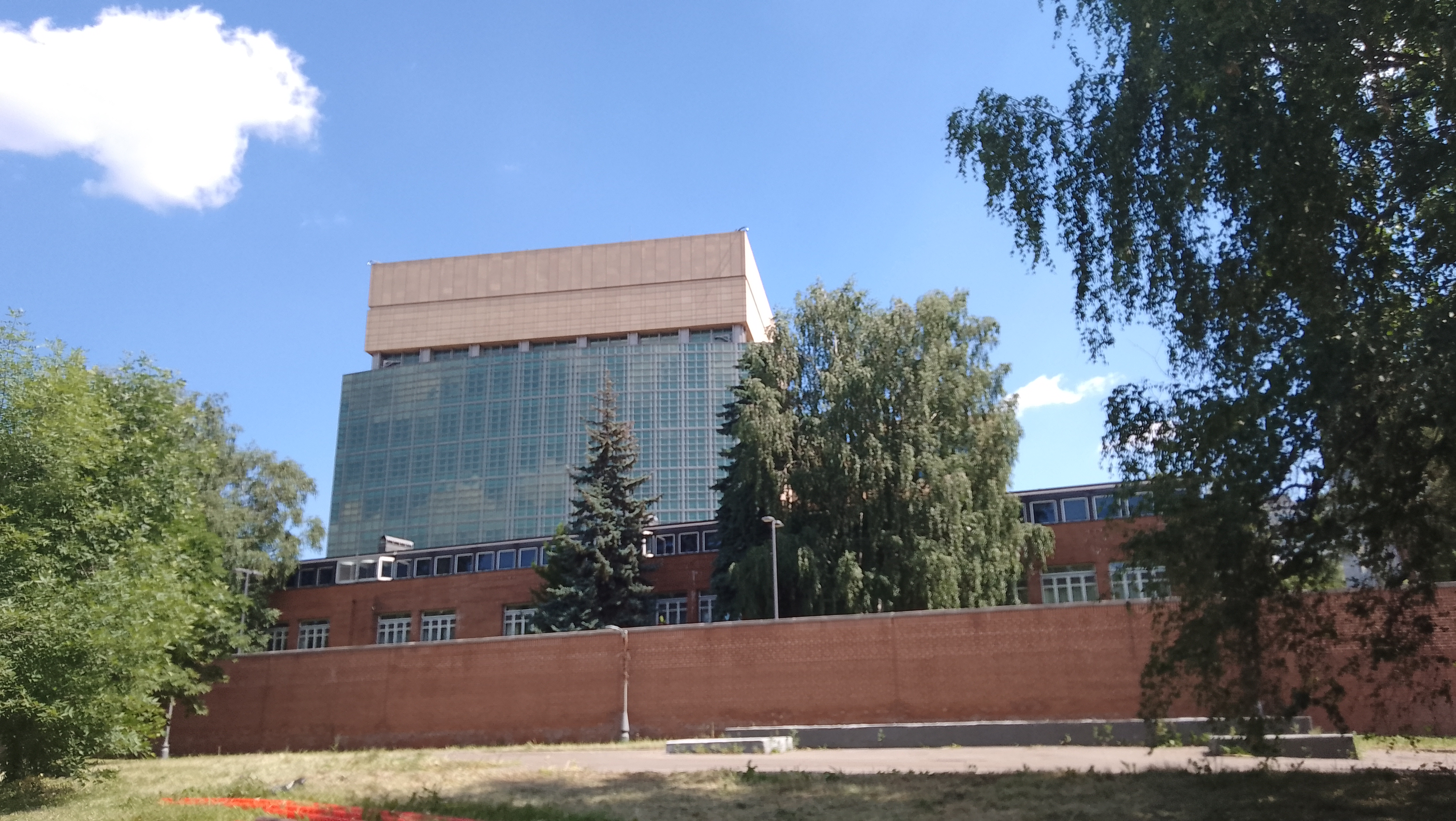
Embassy of the United States in Moscow

== See also ==
- Foreign relations of Russia
- Foreign relations of the United States
- Embassy of Russia, Washington, D.C.
- Embassy of the United States, Moscow
- Ambassadors of Russia to the United States
- Ambassadors of the United States to Russia
- Russian Empire–United States relations
- Soviet Union–United States relations
- Russia–NATO relations
- United States and the Russian invasion of Ukraine
