= Favre family =

Genevan notable family

The Favre family was a family of notables of Geneva, one of many bearing this surname in Romandy.

== Origins and early modern magistrates ==
Coming from Échallens, Jean Favre (d. 1525), a cloth merchant, settled in Geneva around 1480 and was received as a burgher in 1508. The family's social rise was rapid: his son François Favre was a member of the Small Council and bought the fortified house of Vésenaz, which remained family property until 1764. François and his son Gaspard (d. 1556) belonged to the party of Ami Perrin, opposed to Calvin.

Jean (1556–1621), syndic every four years from 1598 to 1619, was the ancestor of a line that provided magistrates to Geneva until the eve of the Revolution. One of them, Ami (1592–1653), first syndic, was lord of Dardagny, and his son Daniel (1626–1696) lord of Châteauvieux and Confignon. Ami's residence on the rue des Etuves was sold in the early eighteenth century and demolished at the end of the nineteenth; its portal was transferred to the house of La Grange, acquired in 1800 and bequeathed to the city of Geneva in 1917.

== Nineteenth-century scholars and philanthropists ==
In the nineteenth century, the Favres, without abandoning political life, produced several scholars: Guillaume (1770–1851), director of the Library and one of the founders of the Société de lecture and of the Société d'histoire et d'archéologie; his sons Edmond Favre and Alphonse Favre; his grandsons William Favre, Camille Favre (1845–1914), archivist-palaeographer and archaeologist, Ernest Favre (1845–1925), geologist, Léopold Favre, and Edouard Favre (1855–1942), historian.

Edmond and his sons were staff officers and authors of military works. Ernest and Edouard were also active in missionary works, and Edmond and Camille sat on the ICRC. Their daughter and sister Alice (1851–1929) chaired the Geneva Red Cross during the First World War. The Favres devoted part of their fortune to philanthropic works.

== Bibliography ==
- Galiffe, Notices généalogiques.
- Almanach généalogique suisse, 4, 198–204; 6, 190–193.
- Livre du Recteur, 3, 284–291.
- Monuments d'art et d'histoire du canton de Genève, 2, 2001, 346–352.
