= Trump–Putin summit =

The Trump–Putin summit may refer to:

- 2018 Russia–United States Summit, meeting between Donald Trump and Vladimir Putin in Helsinki on 16 July 2018.
- 2025 Russia–United States Summit, meeting between Donald Trump and Vladimir Putin at Joint Base Elmendorf–Richardson in Anchorage, Alaska in August 2025.
- China–Russia–United States summit, in 2026 APEC meeting

== See also ==
- 2021 Russia–United States Summit, meeting between Joe Biden and Vladimir Putin in Geneva on 16 June 2021.
- Trump Tower meeting
