= Edmond Favre =

Genevan politician and military officer (1812–1880)

- Born: François-Edmond Favre; 26 July 1812; Geneva
- Died: 26 May 1880 (aged 67); Geneva
- Occupations: Politician, army officer, military writer
- Spouse: Henriette Marie Sarasin
- Relatives: Guillaume Favre (father); Alphonse Favre (brother); Léopold Favre (nephew); William Favre (son)

Edmond Favre (born François-Edmond Favre; 26 July 1812 – 26 May 1880) was a Genevan politician, general staff officer, and military writer, a member of the Favre family of Genevan notables.

== Life and career ==
Favre was the son of Guillaume Favre, a scholar, bibliophile, and owner of the estate of La Grange, and of Catherine Bertrand. He was the brother of Alphonse Favre. He married Henriette Marie Sarasin, daughter of François-Paul Sarasin, a deputy to the Representative Council.

He studied law at the Academy of Geneva from 1832 to 1835 and lived as a rentier. On returning from a long stay in Italy, he laid out the gardens of La Grange.

In 1855, during the debate over the separation of Church and State, Favre sided with the national Church. He was a member of the Constituent Assembly in 1862 and a deputy from 1862 to 1864. He served on the International Committee of the Red Cross from 1866 to 1880.

A general staff officer, he was promoted colonel in 1866 and served as brigade commander, also publishing military works.

== Bibliography ==
- Livre du Recteur, 3, 286.
- L'Etat-major, 3, 57.
- A. Brulhart and E. Deuber-Pauli, Ville et canton de Genève, 1985, 156–157 (2nd ed. 1993).
