= List of Russia–United States summits =

Russia–United States summits are held from 1991 to present.

== List of summits ==
Date	Place	Country	President of the United States	President of Russia	Main article
January 31–February 1, 1992	New York and Camp David	United States	George H. W. Bush	Boris Yeltsin	
June 16–17, 1992	Washington, D.C.	United States	George H. W. Bush	Boris Yeltsin	
July 8, 1992	Munich	Germany	George H. W. Bush	Boris Yeltsin	
January 2–3, 1993	Moscow	Russia	George H. W. Bush	Boris Yeltsin	Signing of the Strategic Arms Reduction Treaty (START II).
April 3–4, 1993	Vancouver	Canada	Bill Clinton	Boris Yeltsin	
July 9–10, 1993	Tokyo	Japan	Bill Clinton	Boris Yeltsin	
January 12–15, 1994	Moscow	Russia	Bill Clinton	Boris Yeltsin	
July 10, 1994	Naples	Italy	Bill Clinton	Boris Yeltsin	
September 27–28, 1994	Washington, D.C.	United States	Bill Clinton	Boris Yeltsin	
December 5, 1994	Budapest	Hungary	Bill Clinton	Boris Yeltsin	
May 9–10, 1995	Moscow	Russia	Bill Clinton	Boris Yeltsin	
June 17, 1995	Halifax, Nova Scotia	Canada	Bill Clinton	Boris Yeltsin	
October 23, 1995	Hyde Park, New York	United States	Bill Clinton	Boris Yeltsin	
March 13, 1996	Sharm al-Sheikh	Egypt	Bill Clinton	Boris Yeltsin	
April 20–21, 1996	Moscow	Russia	Bill Clinton	Boris Yeltsin	
March 21, 1997	Helsinki	Finland	Bill Clinton	Boris Yeltsin	
May 27, 1997	Paris	France	Bill Clinton	Boris Yeltsin	
June 20–21, 1997	Denver	United States	Bill Clinton	Boris Yeltsin	
May 15–17, 1998	Birmingham	United Kingdom	Bill Clinton	Boris Yeltsin	
September 1–2, 1998	Moscow	Russia	Bill Clinton	Boris Yeltsin	Main article: Moscow Summit (1998)
June 19–20, 1999	Cologne	Germany	Bill Clinton	Boris Yeltsin	
September 12, 1999	Auckland	New Zealand	Bill Clinton	Boris Yeltsin	
November 2, 1999	Oslo	Norway	Bill Clinton	Boris Yeltsin	
November 18, 1999	Istanbul	Turkey	Bill Clinton	Boris Yeltsin	
June 3–5, 2000	Moscow	Russia	Bill Clinton	Vladimir Putin	
June 16, 2001	Ljubljana	Slovenia	George W. Bush	Vladimir Putin	Main article: Slovenia Summit 2001
May 24, 2002	Moscow	Russia	George W. Bush	Vladimir Putin	Main article: Strategic Offensive Reductions Treaty
February 24, 2005	Bratislava	Slovakia	George W. Bush	Vladimir Putin	Main article: Slovakia Summit 2005
April 8, 2010	Prague	Czech Republic	Barack Obama	Dmitry Medvedev	Main article: Obama–Medvedev Commission
July 16, 2018	Helsinki	Finland	Donald Trump	Vladimir Putin	Main article: 2018 Russia–United States summit
June 16, 2021	Geneva	Switzerland	Joe Biden	Vladimir Putin	Main article: 2021 Russia–United States summit
August 15, 2025	Anchorage	United States	Donald Trump	Vladimir Putin	Main article: 2025 Russia–United States summit

== See also ==
- Arms control
- Détente
- Foreign policy of the United States
- Foreign relations of Russia
- List of international trips made by presidents of the United States
- Nuclear disarmament
- Russia–United States relations
- List of Soviet Union–United States summits
- 2025 Budapest Summit, a proposed Russia–United States summit that got cancelled back in November 2025
