= William Favre =

Genevan notable and benefactor (1843–1918)

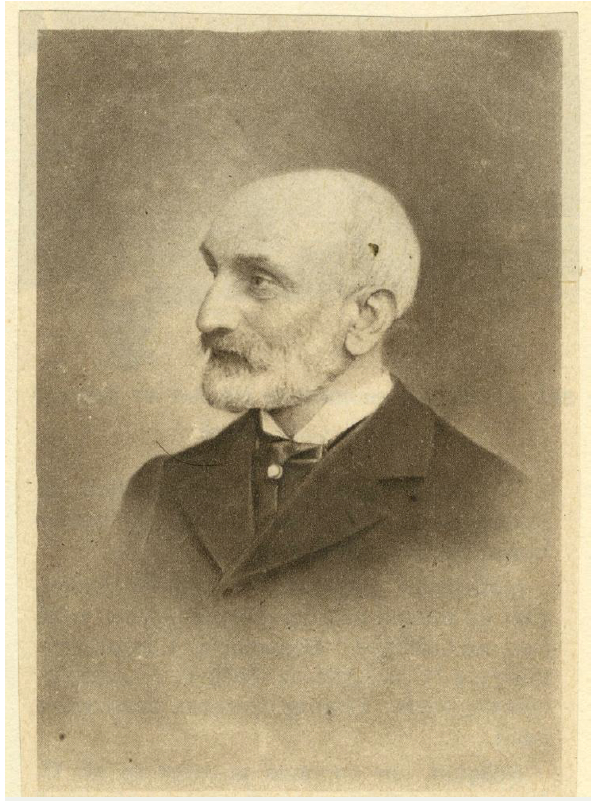
- Born: 5 October 1843; Eaux-Vives (now Geneva)
- Died: 22 February 1918 (aged 74); Eaux-Vives
- Occupations: Municipal councillor, army officer
- Known for: Donation of La Grange to the city of Geneva
- Relatives: Edmond Favre (father); Alphonse Favre (uncle); Léopold Favre (cousin)

William Favre (5 October 1843 – 22 February 1918) was a Genevan notable, municipal councillor, and benefactor, a member of the Favre family of Genevan notables. He is chiefly remembered for the donation of the family estate of La Grange to the city of Geneva.

== Life and career ==
Favre was the son of Edmond Favre, nephew of Alphonse Favre, and cousin of Léopold Favre; he never married. He was an external student at the Academy of Geneva and then studied chemistry in Berlin from 1867 to 1868. He traveled in Turkey and Egypt in 1873 and made a round-the-world journey in 1878. He served as municipal councillor of Eaux-Vives from 1875 to 1899 and as deputy mayor from 1875 to 1878. A cultivated man, he took an interest in the history of Geneva and of his family.

In 1917 he donated to the city of Geneva the estate of La Grange, family property since 1800, keeping the usufruct until his death. Following his father, he laid out the park.

He held the rank of lieutenant-colonel of the general staff.

== Bibliography ==
- Livre du Recteur, 3, 291.
- A. Brulhart and E. Deuber-Pauli, Ville et canton de Genève, 1985, 155–157 (2nd ed. 1993).

=== Archives ===
- Recueil Le Fort, Bibliothèque de Genève (BGE).
