= Léopold Favre =

Swiss philanthropist and pro-Armenian activist (1846–1922)

- Born: 24 December 1846; Geneva
- Died: 4 April 1922 (aged 75); Geneva
- Occupations: Officer, editor, translator, philanthropist
- Spouse: Louise Micheli (m. 1873)

Léopold Favre (24 December 1846 – 4 April 1922) was a Swiss officer, editor, translator, and philanthropist from Geneva, a member of the Favre family of Genevan notables. He is chiefly known for his engagement on behalf of the Armenians, whose fate occupied him in the second half of his life.

== Life and career ==
Favre was the son of Alphonse Favre, nephew of Edmond Favre, and cousin of William Favre. In 1873 he married Louise Micheli (d. 1875). He studied literature at the University of Geneva and then Indology at the universities of Paris, London, and Göttingen. His fortune allowed him to devote himself to the activities that interested him: he was a lieutenant-colonel of infantry, a member of the boards of the Journal de Genève and of the Conservatory, an editor, a translator, and a patron of the arts. His town house on the rue des Granges in Geneva welcomed artists and guests from around the world.

== Engagement for the Armenians ==
Favre was the leading figure of the broad pro-Armenian movement in Switzerland, founded in 1896 and inspired by a mixture of patriotism, internationalism, and Christian philanthropy. A member of the committee of the Conference of Swiss Committees for Aid to the Armenians, and its president from 1918, he supported the movement financially and traveled several times to Istanbul and to the Turkish part of what was then Armenia. Within the committee, in 1915 he advocated on behalf of the survivors of the genocide. He was honorary president of the International Philarmenian League, founded in Geneva in 1920.

== Bibliography ==
- Léopold Favre, 1846–1922, 1923, 71–229.
- K. Meyer, L'Arménie et la Suisse, [1986] (German original 1974).
- H.-L. Kieser, ed., Die armenische Frage und die Schweiz, 1999.
