= François Favre =

Genevan merchant and politician

- Born: between 1480 and 1487
- Died: 28 November 1551 probably Cologny, Republic of Geneva
- Occupations: Cloth merchant, politician
- Spouse(s): Jeanne; Marguerite du Molard
- Father: Jean Favre

François Favre (between 1480 and 1487 – 28 November 1551, probably in Cologny) was a Genevan cloth merchant and politician, member of the Favre family. A member of the Small Council from 1534, he became one of the leaders of the Libertines, or Perrinists, the faction that opposed the moral authority of the consistory following the introduction of the Reformation.

== Biography ==
Favre was the son of Jean Favre, a councillor and cloth merchant. He married twice: first Jeanne, and second the noblewoman Marguerite, widow of Claude du Molard the elder. Like his father, he worked as a cloth merchant, and was elected to the Small Council in 1534. An Eidguenot and friend of the Bernese Hans Franz Nägeli, Favre attended the confirmation of the combourgeoisie between Bern, Fribourg and Geneva in 1530, and in 1536 commanded the Genevan galleys that assisted Nägeli in the capture of Chillon.

Favre adopted the Reformation in 1536 but tolerated poorly its rigor in matters of morals, especially as it was imposed by French pastors. Together with his son-in-law Ami Perrin, he became the leader of the Libertines, or Perrinists, the party opposed to the authority of the consistory. In 1544 he purchased the château of Vésenaz.

== Bibliography ==
- Tripet, Micheline. "Favre, François", in: Historical Dictionary of Switzerland (HDS), version of 2003, revised 8 January 2003. Online: https://hls-dhs-dss.ch/fr/articles/025656/2003-01-08/
