= Slovenia Summit 2001 =

2001 Russia–United States meeting

- Host country: Slovenia
- Date: 16 June 2001
- Cities: Ljubljana, Slovenia
- Participants: (United States) George W. Bush (Russia) Vladimir Putin
- Website: www.sloveniasummit.com

The Slovenia Summit 2001 was a summit meeting between United States President George W. Bush and Russian President Vladimir Putin (hence also known as the Bush-Putin summit). It took place on 16 June 2001, on the Brdo pri Kranju estate in northern Slovenia. It was hosted by the then Prime Minister of Slovenia Janez Drnovšek and by the President of Slovenia Milan Kučan.

Bush and Putin discussed a wide range of political issues and established a diplomatic case for future cooperation and negotiations. This was also Bush's first official trip to Europe as U.S. President.

== Summary ==
Before Bush and Putin met privately, each met with Prime Minister Janez Drnovšek and President Milan Kučan. The Slovenes' talks with Putin focused on the situation in South Eastern Europe, particularly in Macedonia. Kučan familiarized Putin with the agreement reached Friday in Skopje to begin a dialog on constitutional adjustments.

Speaking with Bush, Drnovšek and Kučan focused on NATO expansion and partnership among Europe, the US and Russia. Bush did not go so far as to offer an invitation for membership in NATO as many suspected. He simply reiterated the stance he had taken earlier in his trip, that he supports NATO expansion and is sure that at the summit next year in Prague new members will be invited.

After the meetings, Reuters quoted Bush as saying "I would urge people looking for a good vacation spot to come here." The American president was apparently quite impressed with Drnovšek, Kučan and Slovenia itself, and publicly thanked Drnovšek 'for his hospitality in this spectacular, beautiful country.'"

The summit was judged a success by both sides even though it left Russia and the US little closer to resolving the issues that divided them. The atmosphere was one of friendly co-operation with the two leaders getting on far better than expected. The warmth of the meeting surprised many. The first handshake looked stiff and awkward, but after well over an hour of talks they came out smiling with Bush inviting the Russian leader to visit his ranch in Texas.

Bush described their meeting as straightforward and effective. He said it was time to move beyond Cold War attitudes, away from mutually assured destruction towards mutually earned respect. "We had a very good dialogue. I was able to get a sense of his soul. He's a man deeply committed to his country and the best interests of his country and I appreciate very much the frank dialogue and that's the beginning of a very constructive relationship," Bush said.

Putin also seemed to suggest these two very different leaders had built up a rapport. Echoing Bush he called the United States Russia's partner. Warm words, unthinkable just a few months ago. The Russian leader said both their countries bore a special responsibility for maintaining world peace and security. However he warned that any unilateral action would make that process more complicated - a signal that difficult discussions on NATO and the US missile defense system still lay ahead.

At the closing press conference, in response to a question about whether he could trust Putin, Bush said, "I looked the man in the eye. I found him very straightforward and trustworthy – I was able to get a sense of his soul." Bush's top security aide Condoleezza Rice later wrote that Bush's phrasing had been a serious mistake. "We were never able to escape the perception that the president had naïvely trusted Putin and then been betrayed."

== American agenda ==
The following were the key talking points of the U.S. delegation according to Ariel Cohen:

- Further reductions of their strategic nuclear arsenals;
- The spread of Russian weapons of mass destruction and related technologies to proliferators such as China and insubordinate states such as North Korea, Iran, and Iraq;
- The U.S.-led development and deployment of a global missile defense;
- The consequences of establishing formal regional alliances with China, Iran, or other states hostile to the United States;
- The sovereignty and territorial integrity of the New Independent States (NIS), especially Ukraine and Georgia;
- Economic ties and Russia's accession to the World Trade Organization (WTO); and
- Efforts to increase freedom of the press in Russia and focus on Russia's poor record on human rights in Chechnya.

== Russian agenda ==
Discussions of the imminent threat of Islamist attacks on the U.S. homeland emanating from Afghanistan were held after Putin warned Bush and Condoleezza Rice of the danger. Both of them discounted it as personal bitterness about the Soviet failure in Afghanistan, only to see the September 11 attacks prove him right. Rice later wrote about it in her 2011 memoir No Higher Honour: A Memoir of My Years in Washington:

"Putin suddenly raised the problem of Pakistan. He excoriated the Pervez Musharraf regime for its support of extremists and for the connections of the Pakistani army and intelligence services to the Taliban and al Qaeda. Those extremists were all being funded by Saudi Arabia, he said, and it was only a matter of time until it resulted in a major catastrophe... Putin, though, was right. The Taliban and al-Qaida were time bombs that would explode on September 11, 2001... I was taken aback by Putin's alarm and vehemence."

== See also ==
- Russia–United States relations
- List of Soviet Union–United States summits
- List of Russia–United States summits
- Slovakia Summit 2005
