= Guillaume Favre =

Swiss historian (1770–1851)

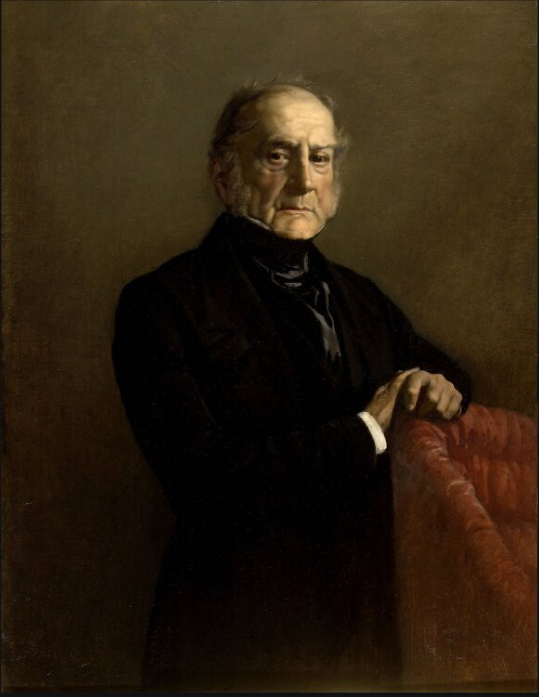
Portrait around 1845 by Barthélemy Menn

Guillaume Favre (1770 – 14 February 1851) was a Swiss scholar, bibliophile and politician from the city of Geneva.

== Life ==
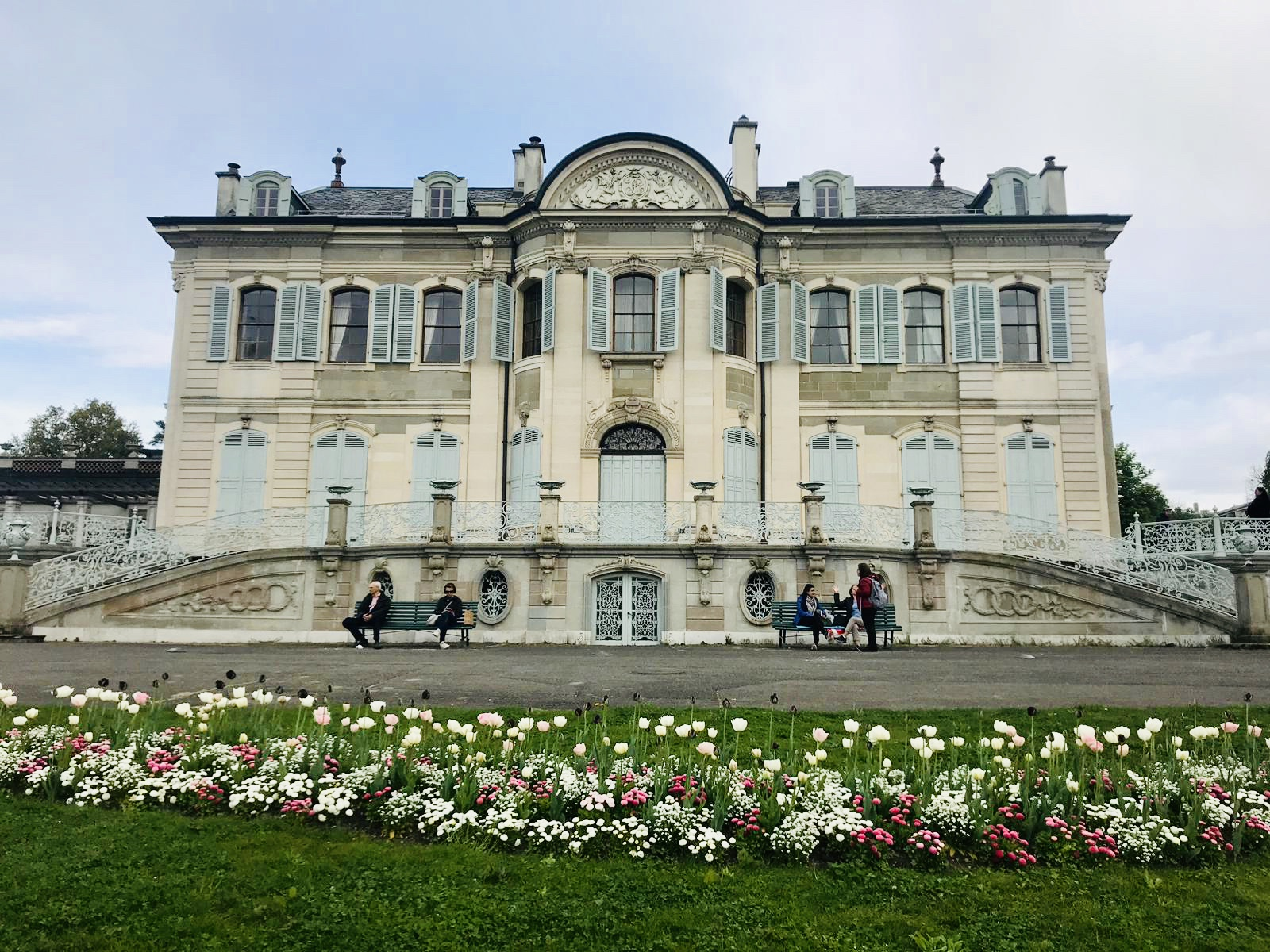
The Villa La Grange, location of the Guillaume Favre library

He was the son of the Swiss merchant François Favre (1736-1814) and Marguerite Favre-Fuzier-Cayla. He was born in Marseille, France, and returned with the family in 1792 to Geneva. Since 1800 François Favre owned the domaine of La Grange in Les Eaux-Vives near Geneva.

Guillaume Favre studied in Marseille, Geneva and Paris archaeology and mineralogy. He created a rich geological collection and the famous library in the villa La Grange. He published some books on historical and philological themes.

He was a member of the board of Geneva's city library and the founder of several associations, as the Société de lecture of Geneva and the Société d’histoire et d’archéologie de Genève. He supported the research of the French linguist François Just Marie Raynouard and of the German biblical scholar Constantin von Tischendorf.

In 1811 Guillaume Favre married Catherine Bertrand (1783–1841). They had three children, Alphonse, geologist, Edmond (1812-1880) and Emilie (1824-1889).

A portrait of Guillaume Favre is part of the Geneva Musée d'Art et d'Histoire collection.
