= 2018 Russia–United States summit =

Meeting between Donald Trump and Vladimir Putin in Helsinki

2018 Russia–United States Summit

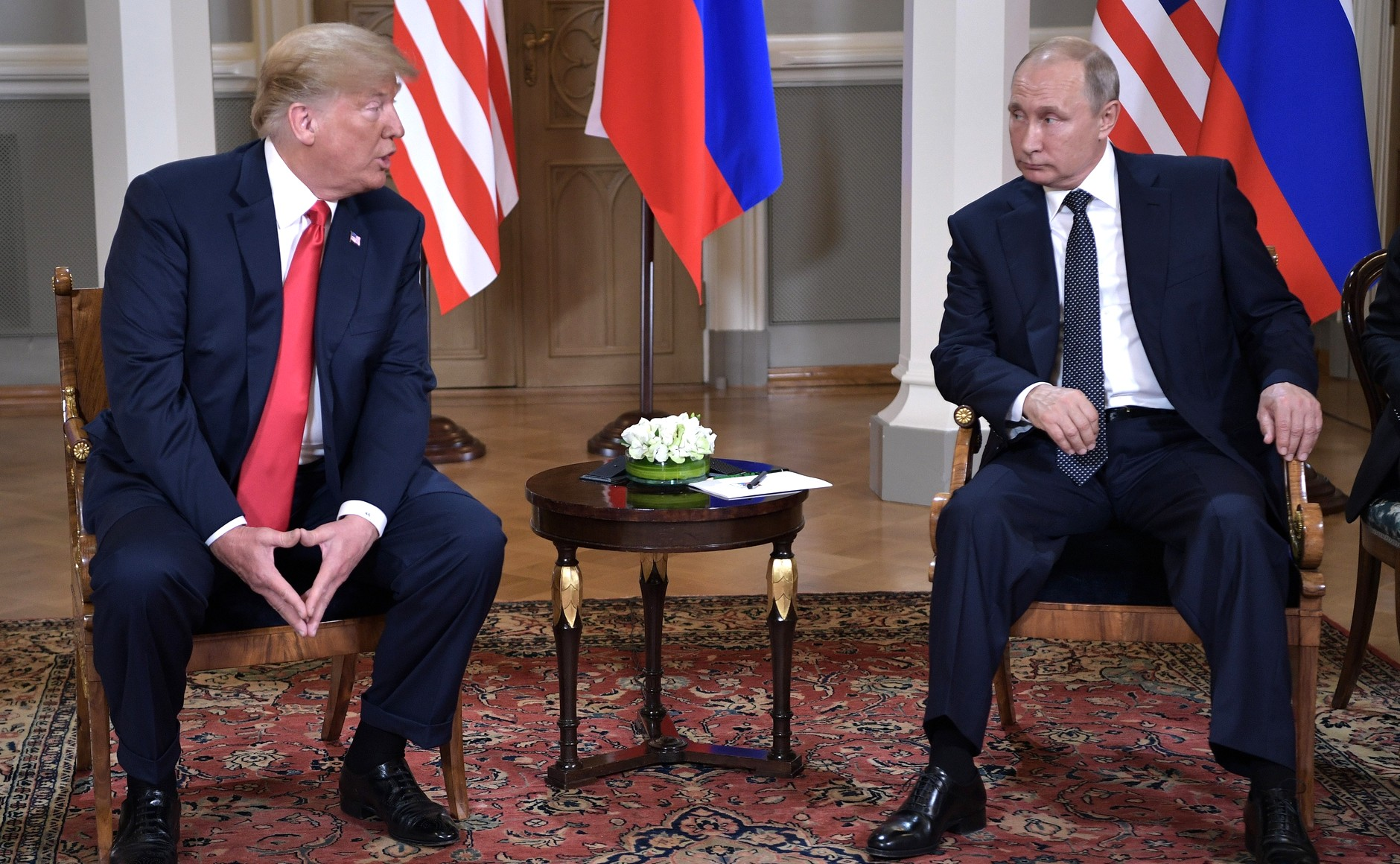
- Donald Trump and Vladimir Putin during the summit
- Host country: Finland
- Date: 16 July 2018
- Cities: Helsinki
- Venues: Presidential Palace
- Participants: (United States) Donald Trump (United States) Mike Pompeo (Russia) Vladimir Putin (Russia) Sergey Lavrov
- Precedes: 2021 Summit
- Website: um.fi/helsinki2018

The 2018 Russia–United States Summit (also known as the 2018 Helsinki Summit or the Trump–Putin Summit in Helsinki) was a summit meeting between United States president Donald Trump and Russian president Vladimir Putin on 16 July 2018, in Helsinki, Finland. The Finnish Ministry for Foreign Affairs officially titled the summit as the #HELSINKI2018 Meeting and it was hosted by the president of Finland, Sauli Niinistö.

During a post-summit joint press conference with Putin, Trump did not accept Russian interference was part of the 2016 U.S. elections. Trump's omissions provoked an uproar across the political spectrum, including from some of his usual allies. One day later, Trump amended part of his remarks, contending that he had misspoken due to an incorrectly perceived "double-negative".

Although the proceedings of the summit were orderly and diplomatic, both Trump and Putin were received poorly by both sides of the political spectrum in the United States, with some commentators saying that the summit became the event where Putin "cemented his status, and the status of his country, as public enemy #1 in America," ushering in the lowest point of Russia–United States relations since the early 1980s.

== History ==
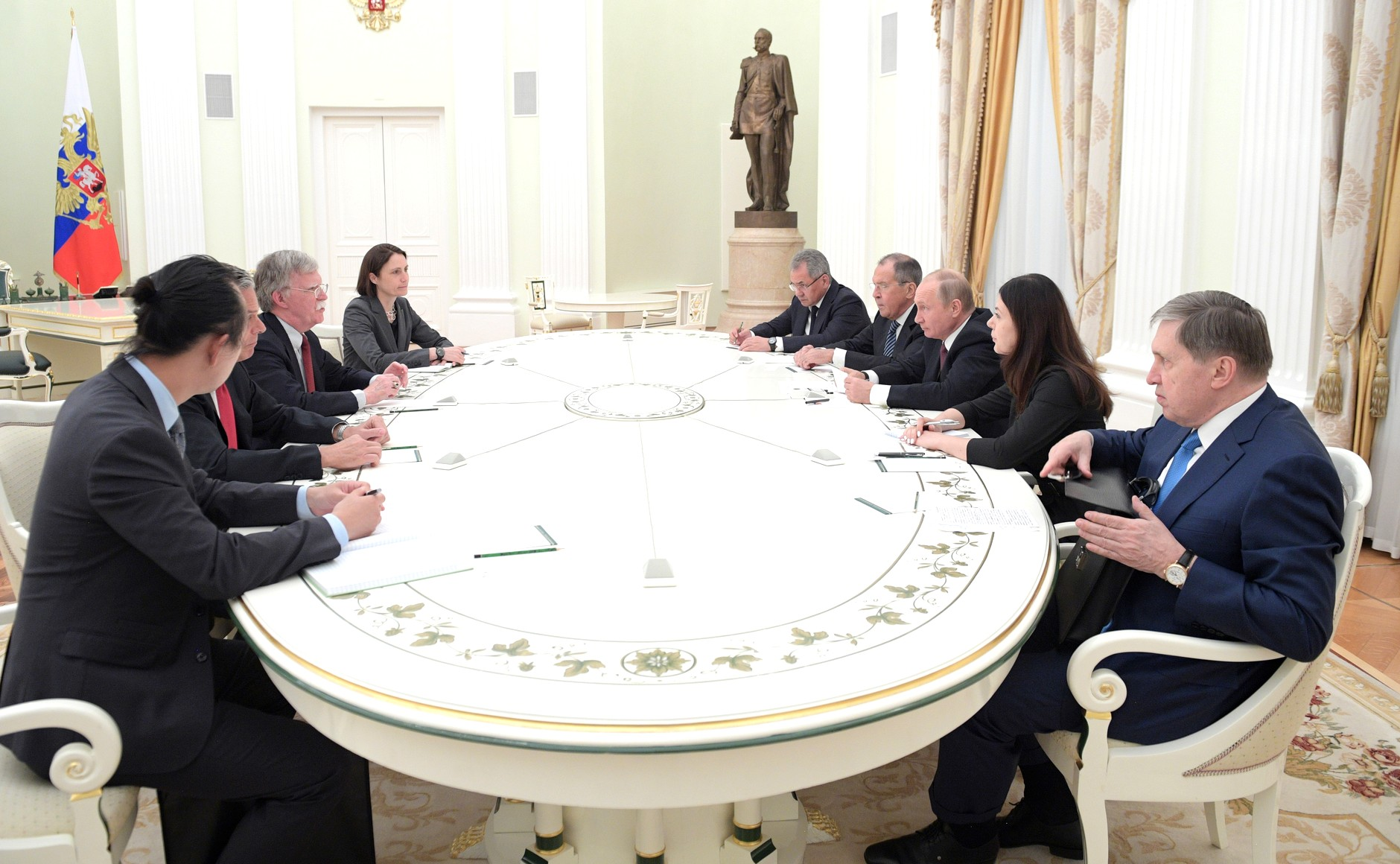
President Vladimir Putin and NSC Advisor John Bolton meeting at the Kremlin, Moscow, on June 27, 2018, to discuss the summit

Helsinki previously served as the location for the signing of the Helsinki Accords in 1975, following a series of meetings intended to reduce tensions between the Western and Soviet blocs during the Cold War. The U.S. national security advisor John R. Bolton met with Putin on 27 June to discuss the details of the summit and other bilateral issues. On 28 June, the location of the summit was announced by the White House and the Kremlin to be Helsinki.

== Background ==
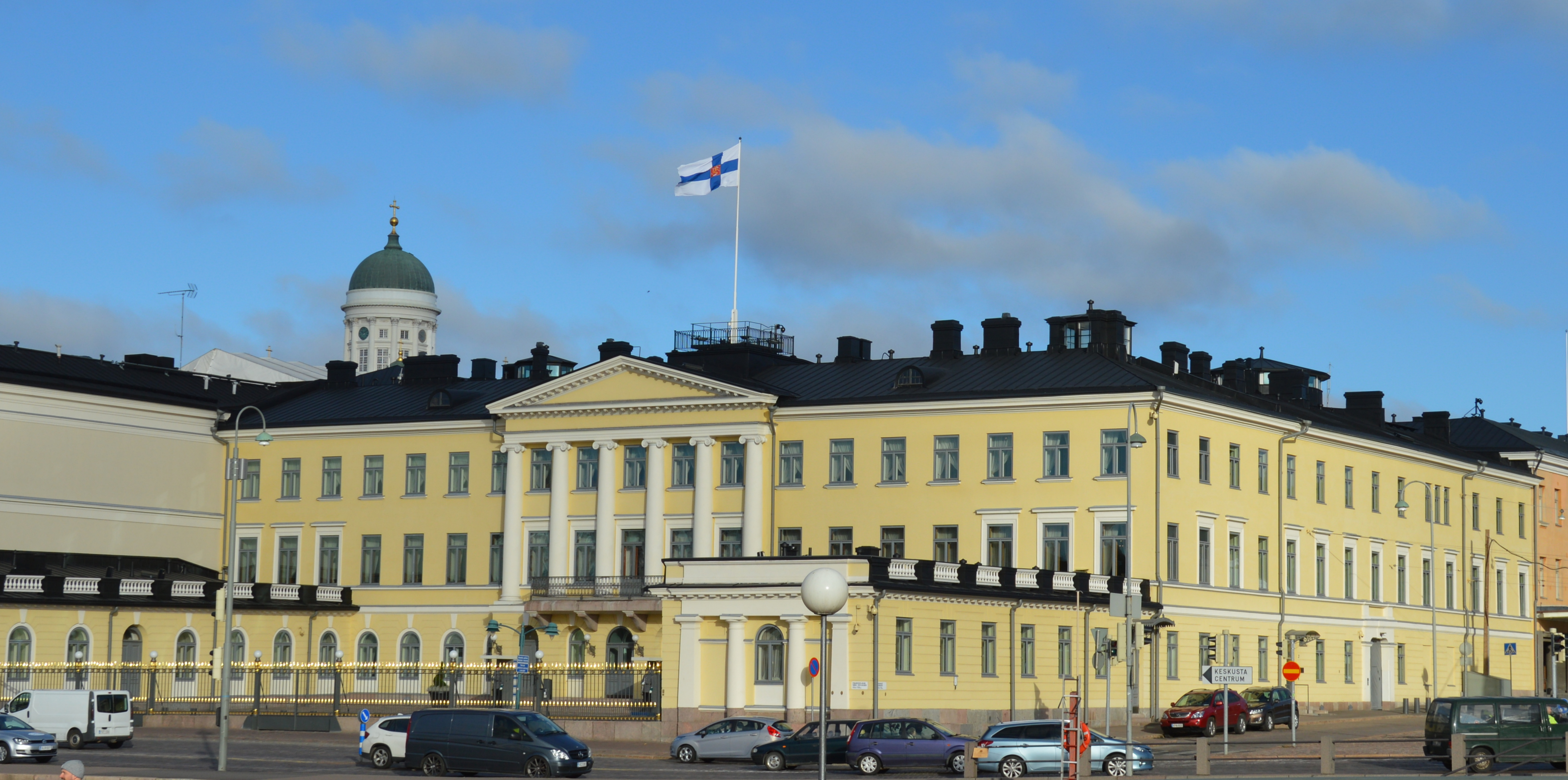
The Presidential Palace in Helsinki, the venue of the summit

The summit was officially called the #HELSINKI2018 Meeting by the Finnish Ministry of Foreign Affairs and was hosted by the president of Finland Sauli Niinistö. The summit took place in the Presidential Palace and marked the first official meeting between the leaders after previous unofficial talks between Trump and Putin at the G20 Hamburg and APEC Vietnam summits held in 2017. Topics Trump announced to be discussed at the summit included the situations in Syria and Ukraine. The United States secretary of state Mike Pompeo met his Russian and Finnish counterparts Sergey Lavrov and Timo Soini.

Niinistö held bilateral meetings with both presidents on the day of the summit. That morning, Niinistö and Finnish First Lady Jenni Haukio welcomed Trump and U.S. First Lady Melania Trump at their main official residence in Mäntyniemi. During the presidents' meeting, the two women met for a joint breakfast.

The meeting began at the Presidential Palace at approximately 1 pm with Niinistö officially welcoming Putin, followed by Trump. The bilateral discussions between the American and Russian presidents took place in the Presidential Palace's Gothic Hall; Trump and Putin met with only interpreters present. Their meeting was followed by a working lunch including additional officials in the Hall of Mirrors.

NATO secretary-general Jens Stoltenberg and former Soviet leader Mikhail Gorbachev said they welcomed Trump's planned meeting with Vladimir Putin.

On 13 July, three days before the summit, Rod Rosenstein, the United States Deputy Attorney General, announced indictments of 12 Russian GRU officers for their efforts in the 2016 Democratic National Committee email leak, through the establishment of false identities as DCLeaks and Guccifer 2.0, as well as charges of money laundering using bitcoin. The timing of these indictments led to closer scrutiny of the upcoming meeting and pressure for Trump to discuss election meddling with Putin. Bloomberg News reported the day after the summit that Trump permitted the indictments to be announced prior to the summit hoping it would strengthen his position in negotiations with Putin.

Two days before the scheduled meeting, a group of top Senate Democrats urged Trump to not meet with Putin one-on-one. Signers of a letter advising him not to meet alone with Putin included Minority Leader Charles Schumer, Minority Whip Dick Durbin, and the top Democrats on the Senate Intelligence (Mark Warner), Foreign Relations (Bob Menendez), Judiciary (Dianne Feinstein), Armed Services (Jack Reed), Appropriations (Patrick Leahy), and Banking (Sherrod Brown) committees.

=== Controversial remarks ===
During an interview on the eve of the summit with CBS News, Trump was asked who America's biggest foe is. He said Russia is "a foe in certain aspects" and called the European Union the biggest trade foe of the United States. Trump tweeted on the morning of the summit that the relationship between Russia and the U.S. has "never been worse". He blamed this on "foolishness and stupidity" on the part of the U.S., and referenced the ongoing Special Counsel investigation into Russian interference in the 2016 elections, calling it a "witch hunt". The Russian Ministry of Foreign Affairs retweeted Trump's message, adding "We agree". Trump also indicated his inclination to accept Putin's denial of Russian interference, saying "President Putin says it's not Russia. I don't see any reason why it would be."

== Demonstrations ==
According to the Finnish Broadcasting Company Yle, more than 10 demonstrations were planned for the summit. On Sunday 15 July, about 2,500 protesters gathered for the "Helsinki Calling" pro-human rights demonstration at the Helsinki Senate Square. Simultaneously, the youth section of the nationalist Finns Party staged a pro-Trump rally. The "Welcome Trump" event gathered a crowd of 50 people including Finns Party youth and Soldiers of Odin members.

More demonstrations were planned for Monday 16 July, including the "Stop Putin" and "Helsinki against Trump and Putin" rallies and protests for women's rights, Afghanistan and against Russophobia. The youth section of the right-wing National Coalition Party said they would hold a demonstration against President Trump's trade policy and Russia's annexation of Crimea.

On the day of the summit, large crowds gathered in Helsinki city center to see the heads of states proceeding to and out of the presidential palace in their vehicles.

== Delegations ==
=== United States delegation ===
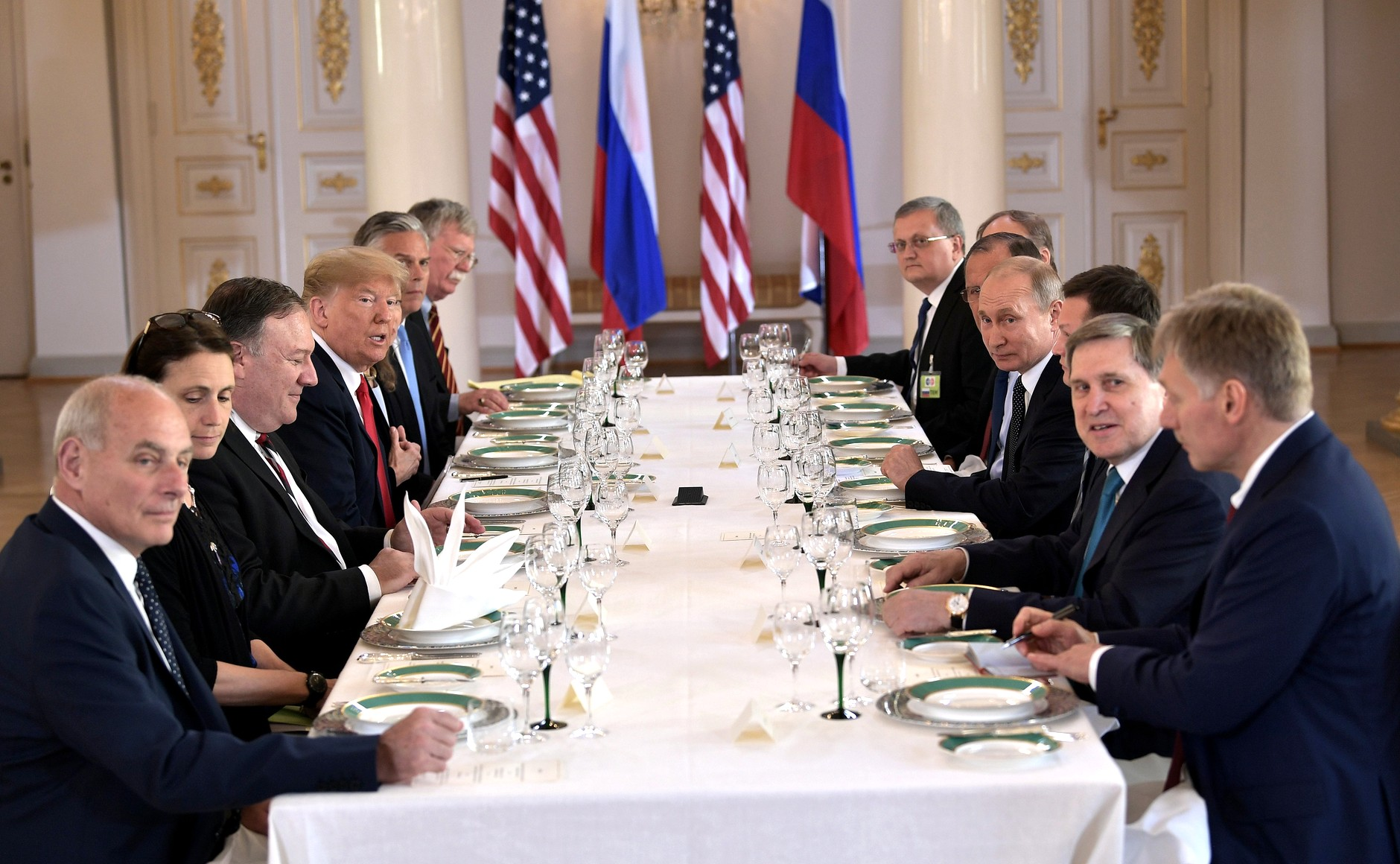
Talks between the U.S. delegation headed by Trump and the Russian delegation headed by Putin at the summit in Helsinki, 16 July 2018

- President of the United States, Donald Trump
- (United States) Secretary of State, Mike Pompeo
- (United States) National Security Advisor, John Bolton
- (United States) White House Chief of Staff, John F. Kelly
- United States Ambassador to Russia, Jon Huntsman Jr.
- (United States) White House Press Secretary, Sarah Huckabee Sanders
- (United States) White House Deputy Chief of Staff, Zachary Fuentes
- (United States) Advisor to the President, Fiona Hill

=== Russian delegation ===
- (Russia) President of the Russian Federation, Vladimir Putin
- (Russia) Russian Foreign Affairs Minister, Sergey Lavrov
- (Russia) Russian Ambassador to the United States, Anatoly Antonov
- (Russia) Foreign Affairs Assistant to the President, Yuri Ushakov
- (Russia) Kremlin Press Secretary, Dmitry Peskov

== Private meeting ==
Trump and Putin met privately without aides or note-takers, accompanied only by a single Russian-provided interpreter. There were no U.S. personnel in attendance at the meeting. The meeting had been scheduled for 90 minutes but lasted two hours. The private meeting was followed by a working lunch that included senior advisors.

=== Topics discussed ===
No agenda was published for their discussion, and no communique was issued afterward. Some issues were touched on at the press conference. In the following days Russia issued multiple statements about what it said were agreements made at the summit, "shaping a narrative of the meeting with no confirmation or alternative account from the Trump administration."

In the press conference immediately following the meeting, both leaders described some of their positions. On the question of the Syrian civil war, Trump wanted Iranian troops to leave Syria, while Putin would not commit to their departure. Both agreed that Iranian troops should be kept away from the Israel-Syria border, with Trump noting that "Creating safety for Israel is something both Putin and I would like to see very much." Trump said he is willing to help Syria with humanitarian aid, even if there is no wider peace settlement.

That may contradict the earlier Trump administration position that it will not provide reconstruction assistance to any part of Syria that remains under the control of Bashar al-Assad, whom Russia backs. The Russian ambassador to the U.S. later said that Syria had been the major topic of discussion, along with "the removal of the concerns that the United States has regarding the well-known claims about alleged interference in the elections". Four days after the meeting, a Russian military spokesman said Russia has sent formal proposals for a joint U.S.-Russian effort to reconstruct Syria and facilitate the return home of Syrian refugees.

In a Fox News interview the next day, Putin indicated that the two had agreed to disagree about Crimea. Putin said he wanted acceptance of the disputed 2014 referendum in which Crimeans voted to become part of Russia, and insisted that Ukraine must never become part of NATO. He said they had agreed to hold talks on extension of the START treaty, which expires in 2021, but he wants to see evidence that the U.S. has lived up to the terms of the treaty. He also wants to negotiate on the 1987 Intermediate Nuclear Treaty.

The day after the meeting, a Russian military spokesman said that Russia is "ready for practical implementation of the agreements reached between Russian President Vladimir Putin and US President Donald Trump in the sphere of international security achieved at the Helsinki summit." His statement said the agreements include cooperation in Syria and discussions about extending the START Treaty. No agreements were announced at the summit, and White House and Pentagon spokesmen said they were not aware of any new agreements.

A spokesman for the National Security Council said "As President Trump stated, the two sides agreed that their national security council staffs will follow up on the presidents' meetings, and these discussions are underway. There were no commitments to undertake any concrete action, beyond agreement that both sides should continue discussions." The spokesman said they are also reviewing suggestions by Putin for a "cyber-group" and an anti-terrorism group.

At a press conference four days after the summit, Director of National Intelligence Dan Coats stated, "I'm not in a position to either understand fully or talk about what happened in Helsinki," and ceded the podium to national security advisor John Bolton, who explained that the issue of election interference was discussed. Despite this, Senate minority leader Chuck Schumer remarked, "It is utterly amazing, utterly amazing, that no one knows what was said." Senator Jeanne Shaheen and Representative Bill Pascrell called for Trump's interpreter, Marina Gross, to testify before Congress, while House Intelligence Committee ranking member Adam Schiff called for her to testify to the Committee in closed session.

== Press conference ==
The English version of the press conference from the White House

The Russian version of the press conference from the Kremlin

After the private meeting and the working lunch, Trump and Putin gave a joint press conference. When Trump was asked whether he would condemn Russian interference in the 2016 U.S. election, he demurred, saying that Putin had denied it.

JONATHAN LEMIRE, ASSOCIATED PRESS: President Trump, you first. Just now, President Putin denied having anything to do with the election interference in 2016. Every U.S. intelligence agency has concluded that Russia did. My first question for you sir is, who do you believe? My second question is would you now, with the whole world watching, tell President Putin, would you denounce what happened in 2016 and would you want him to never do it again?

TRUMP: So let me just say that we have two thoughts. You have groups that are wondering why the FBI never took the server. Why haven't they taken the server? Why was the FBI told to leave the office of the Democratic National Committee?

I've been wondering that. I've been asking that for months and months and I've been tweeting it out and calling it out on social media. Where is the server? I want to know where is the server and what is the server saying?

With that being said, all I can do is ask the question.

My people came to me, Dan Coats, came to me and some others they said they think it's Russia. I have President Putin. He just said it's not Russia.

I will say this: I don't see any reason why it would be. But I really do want to see the server but I have, I have confidence in both parties.

[...]

I have great confidence in my intelligence people but I will tell you that President Putin was extremely strong and powerful in his denial today and what he did is an incredible offer.

He offered to have the people working on the case come and work with their investigators, with respect to the 12 people. I think that's an incredible offer. Ok? Thank you.

During the press conference, Jeff Mason from Reuters asked whether Putin had wanted Donald Trump to win the 2016 presidential election and had he directed any of his officials to help him do that? Putin replied: "Yes, I did. Because he talked about bringing the US-Russia relationship back to normal." This contradicted a tweet sent by Trump in which he claimed: "I'm very concerned that Russia will be fighting very hard to have an impact on the upcoming Election. Based on the fact that no President has been tougher on Russia than me, they will be pushing very hard for the Democrats. They definitely don't want Trump!" All reference to that exchange between Mason and the Russian leader was omitted from the official White House transcript.

Asked whether Russia possessed any compromising material on Trump, Putin laughed and talked about the number of businessmen who visit Russia, but did not give a direct answer. Trump commented that if any such material existed "it would have been out long ago".

== Follow-up ==
=== Reaction ===
The hours immediately following the summit drew bipartisan criticism in the United States. Criticism focused on Trump's perceived acceptance of Putin's denial of involvement in Russian interference in the 2016 United States elections, which contradicted the findings of the United States Intelligence Community, and stood in pointed contrast to the indictment of twelve Russian GRU agents just three days earlier in the ongoing Special Counsel investigation: U.S. media reaction was almost universally negative, even from many commentators on Fox News who usually supported the president. International news coverage of the summit was mostly negative in Europe, triumphant in Russia, and muted in China.

Democrats universally condemned Trump's performance. House minority leader Nancy Pelosi called it a "sad day for America." Senate Democrats led by Jeanne Shaheen called for American interpreter Marina Gross, who sat in on the private meeting with Putin, to be questioned before the Senate Foreign Relations Committee. Shaheen added, if the administration is to exert executive privilege, "we need to find another way to get the information." Senator Chuck Schumer said "We need hearings as soon as possible", with testimony from members of Trump's national security team present during the Helsinki summit, including Secretary of State Mike Pompeo."

NBC News reported that "key senators were preparing to grill" Pompeo "on Russia and North Korea" when he briefs them and that "tempers flared" during a 18 July 2018 Senate Foreign Relations committee hearing at which this was discussed. New Jersey Senator Robert Menendez, top Democrat on the Senate Foreign Relations Committee, stated "If the administration is unwilling to consult with this committee in a meaningful fashion on vital national security issues, then we must consider all appropriate responses." Republican committee chairman Bob Corker stated, "On challenging what happened at NATO, what happened at Helsinki, I will take a backseat to no one in this body," after previously stating that "the dam has broken."

Many Republicans in Congress strongly criticized Trump as well. Senator Bob Corker claimed Trump "made us look like a pushover", Senator Ben Sasse called Trump's remarks "bizarre and flat-out wrong", while Senator Tim Scott wondered if "today was a step backwards". Others including Paul Ryan and Mitch McConnell reaffirmed support for the U.S. intelligence community without directly condemning Trump. Newt Gingrich, a longtime Trump supporter, said Trump's statements about the U.S. intelligence community were "the most serious mistake of his presidency and must be corrected — immediately".

Senator John McCain and former Governor Mitt Romney, the Republican nominees for president in 2008 and 2012, respectively, both strongly criticized Trump. Romney said Trump's siding with Putin rather than U.S. intelligence agencies was "disgraceful and detrimental to our democratic principles", while McCain called the summit "one of the most disgraceful performances by an American president in memory."

Republican Senator Rand Paul was the lone voice in the Senate to support Trump in the matter, saying that Trump should be "lauded and not belittled" for being "willing to meet with adversaries to try to prevent us from having World War III". A few Republican members of the House of Representatives also made supportive comments.

Shortly after the summit concluded, CNN reported that Trump's "stunned aides wonder what went wrong" and "openly admitted they don't know how to respond to questions," quoting one official involved with the summit as saying "this was not the plan." The Washington Post and The Wall Street Journal later reported that there was extensive planning before the summit to confront Putin, with one official saying the plan was for Trump to "shove [the Mueller indictments of 12 Russians] in Putin's face and look strong doing it" during both the private meeting and public press conference, but that Trump "did the exact opposite."

The New York Times, Time magazine, and The New Yorker magazine mocked Trump and the summit. The New York Times' online opinion page displayed homoerotic imagery of Trump and Putin in an animated cartoon by Bill Plympton. A morphed image of a Trump-Putin hybrid was published on the Time magazine cover. The New Yorker magazine cover art displayed a parody of Trump's 15 June 15, 2015 golden escalator announcement of his candidacy, showing a dead and flattened Trump laid out face down, but giving the "thumbs-up" at the bottom of the escalator.

Television commentators presented criticism of Trump and the summit. David Gergen, an advisor to four presidents including Ronald Reagan, stated "I've never heard an American president talk that way, but I think it's especially true that when he's with someone like Putin — who is a thug, a world-class thug — that he sides with him again and again against his own country's interests." Fox & Friends, a morning program which Trump is known to regularly watch, was critical of Trump's performance, with co-host Brian Kilmeade speaking directly to the president, "I will say this to the president: when Newt Gingrich, when General Jack Keane, when Matt Schlapp say the president fell short and made our intelligence apparatus look bad, I think it's time to pay attention."

On MSNBC, Watergate prosecutor Jill Wine-Banks said that the Russian meddling attempts were as serious to her "as the Cuban Missile Crisis...or the 9/11 attack" and further stated that the summit will "live in infamy as much as" the Attack on Pearl Harbor or Kristallnacht. Former national security advisor Susan Rice stated that the US-Russia summit was a bad mistake, citing many reasons, and that any future meeting would be premature.

Glenn Greenwald, one of the founding editors of The Intercept, said that "90 percent of the world's nuclear weapons are in the hands of two countries—the United States and Russia—and having them speak and get along is much better than having them isolate one another and increase the risk of not just intentional conflict, but misperception and miscommunication, as well."

=== Trump viewed as being under Putin's influence ===
The Steele dossier alleges that the Russians possess kompromat on Trump which can be used to blackmail him, and that the Kremlin promised him that the kompromat will not be used as long as he continues his cooperation with them. Trump's actions at the Helsinki summit in 2018 "led many to conclude that Steele's report was more accurate than not.... Trump sided with the Russians over the U.S. intelligence community's assessment that Moscow had waged an all-out attack on the 2016 election,... The joint news conference,.. cemented fears among some that Trump was in Putin's pocket and prompted bipartisan backlash."

At the joint news conference, when asked directly about the subject, Putin denied that he had any kompromat on Trump. Even though Trump was reportedly given a "gift from Putin" the weekend of the pageant, Putin argued "that he did not even know Trump was in Russia for the Miss Universe pageant in 2013 when, according to the Steele dossier, video of Trump was secretly recorded to blackmail him."

In reaction to Trump's actions at the summit, Senator Chuck Schumer (D-N.Y.) spoke in the Senate:

Millions of Americans will continue to wonder if the only possible explanation for this dangerous and inexplicable behavior is the possibility — the very real possibility — that President Putin holds damaging information over President Trump.

Several operatives, and lawyers in the U.S. intelligence community reacted strongly to Trump's performance at the summit. They described it as "subservien[ce] to Putin" and a "fervent defense of Russia's military and cyber aggression around the world, and its violation of international law in Ukraine" which they saw as "harmful to US interests". They also suggested that he was either a "Russian asset" or a "useful idiot" for Putin, and that he looked like "Putin's puppet".

Former Director of National Intelligence James Clapper wondered "if Russians have something on Trump", and former CIA director John O. Brennan, who has accused Trump of "treason", tweeted: "He is wholly in the pocket of Putin." Former acting CIA director Michael Morell has called Trump "an unwitting agent of the Russian federation", and former CIA director Michael V. Hayden said Trump was a "useful fool" who is "manipulated by Moscow".

In 2019, The Washington Post reported that Trump had later attempted to conceal details of his discussions with Putin, in one instance taking possession of his interpreter's translation notes. Trump denied concealing anything in an interview on Fox News.

=== Trump's follow-up ===
Trump's statement on 17 July

The next day, Trump, reading from a prepared statement, claimed that he had mistakenly used the word "would" when he had meant to say "wouldn't", acknowledging Russian attempts at meddling in the 2016 election but denying Trump-Russia collusion. Trump paused reading his prepared statement to interject that the interference "Could be other people also. A lot of people out there." In the past, Trump had questioned many times if Russia was responsible, and on several previous occasions when he did say Russia was responsible, he also said that other countries might also have meddled.

The American intelligence community has consistently concluded that Russia was responsible for the hacking, with three intelligence agencies having "high confidence" that Russian interference was ordered by Putin himself. Trump then suggested on Twitter that his critics would rather go to war with Russia than see him get along with Putin.

During an interview three days after the summit, Trump told CBS News that he holds the Russian president, Vladimir Putin, personally responsible for Russia's attempts at meddling in the 2016 US presidential election.

Trump asked his national security adviser, John R. Bolton, to invite Mr. Putin to Washington, to continue dialogue that began in Helsinki. In a tweet, Trump indicated he looked forward to a second meeting with Mr. Putin "so that we can start implementing some of the many things discussed" in Helsinki.

=== Russian public opinion ===
Survey results published by Levada-Center indicate that, as of July 2018, Russians increasingly viewed the United States positively following the presidential summit.

=== Possibility of Russia interrogating U.S. citizens ===
During his joint press conference with Putin, Trump stated, "And what [Putin] did is an incredible offer; he offered to have the people working on the [Special Counsel investigation] come and work with their investigators with respect to the 12 [Russians who were under indictment in America]. I think that's an incredible offer." Trump did not mention the quid pro quo for Putin's offer, which was to have Russians interrogate 11 U.S. citizens.

Two days later, White House press secretary Sarah Sanders confirmed that Putin and Trump had discussed the possibility of Russian officials questioning Michael McFaul, a former US ambassador to Russia, as well as Putin critic Bill Browder and others, in exchange for allowing investigators of the Special Counsel investigation to question twelve Russians who are under indictment in America. Sanders stated in a press conference, "The president will work with his team and we'll let you know if there's an announcement on that front." State Department spokeswoman Heather Nauert called the Russian request "absolutely absurd."

Critics assailed Trump for even considering subjecting a former American diplomat to questioning by a hostile foreign power. As the Republican-controlled Senate prepared to vote on a resolution opposing the Putin proposal, Sanders stated that Trump "disagrees" with the Putin proposal. The Senate approved the non-binding "sense of the Senate" resolution, which stated that no current or former diplomat or other government employee should be made available to the Russians for interrogation, on a 98–0 vote.

== Gallery ==
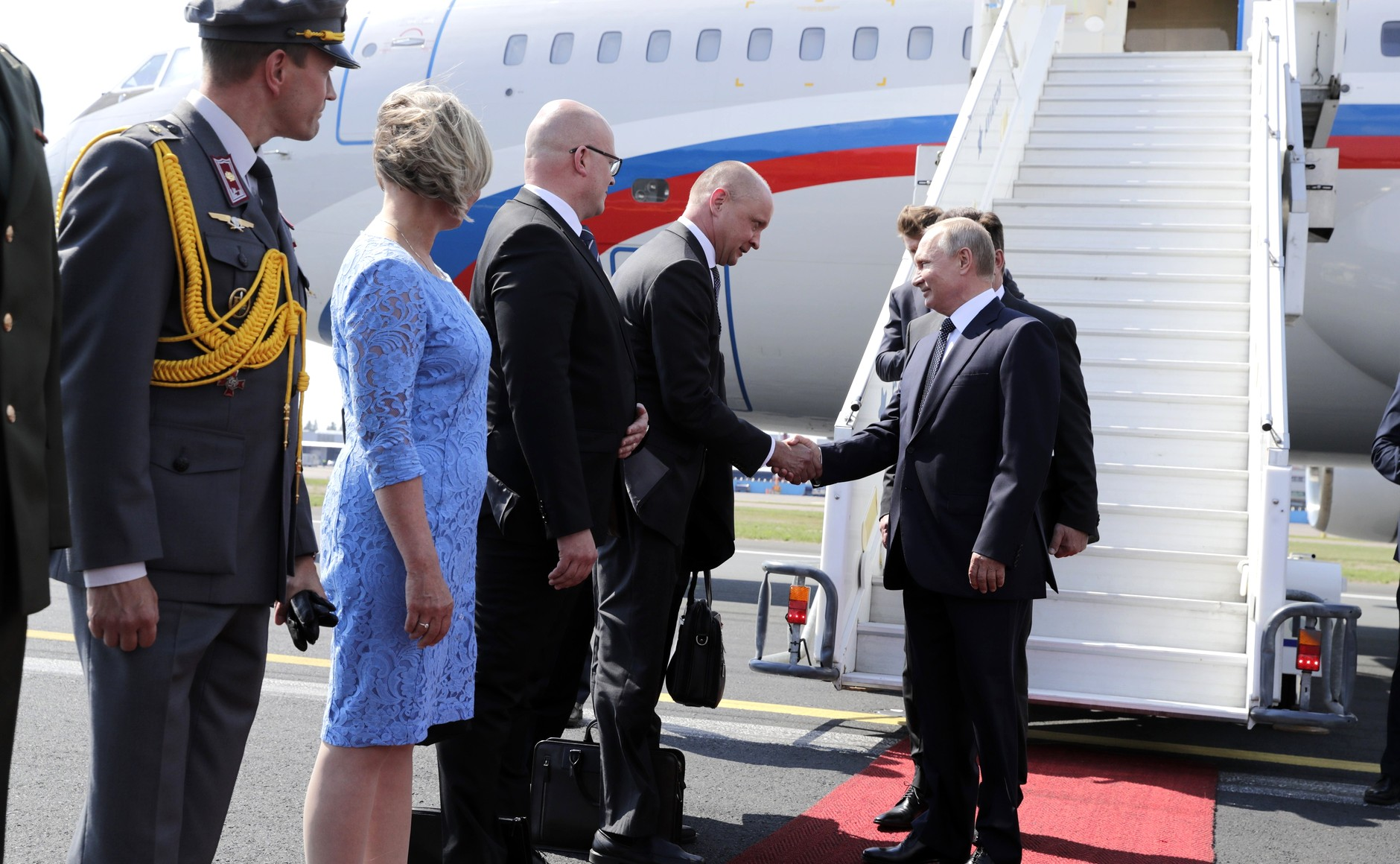
Vladimir Putin arrives in Finland

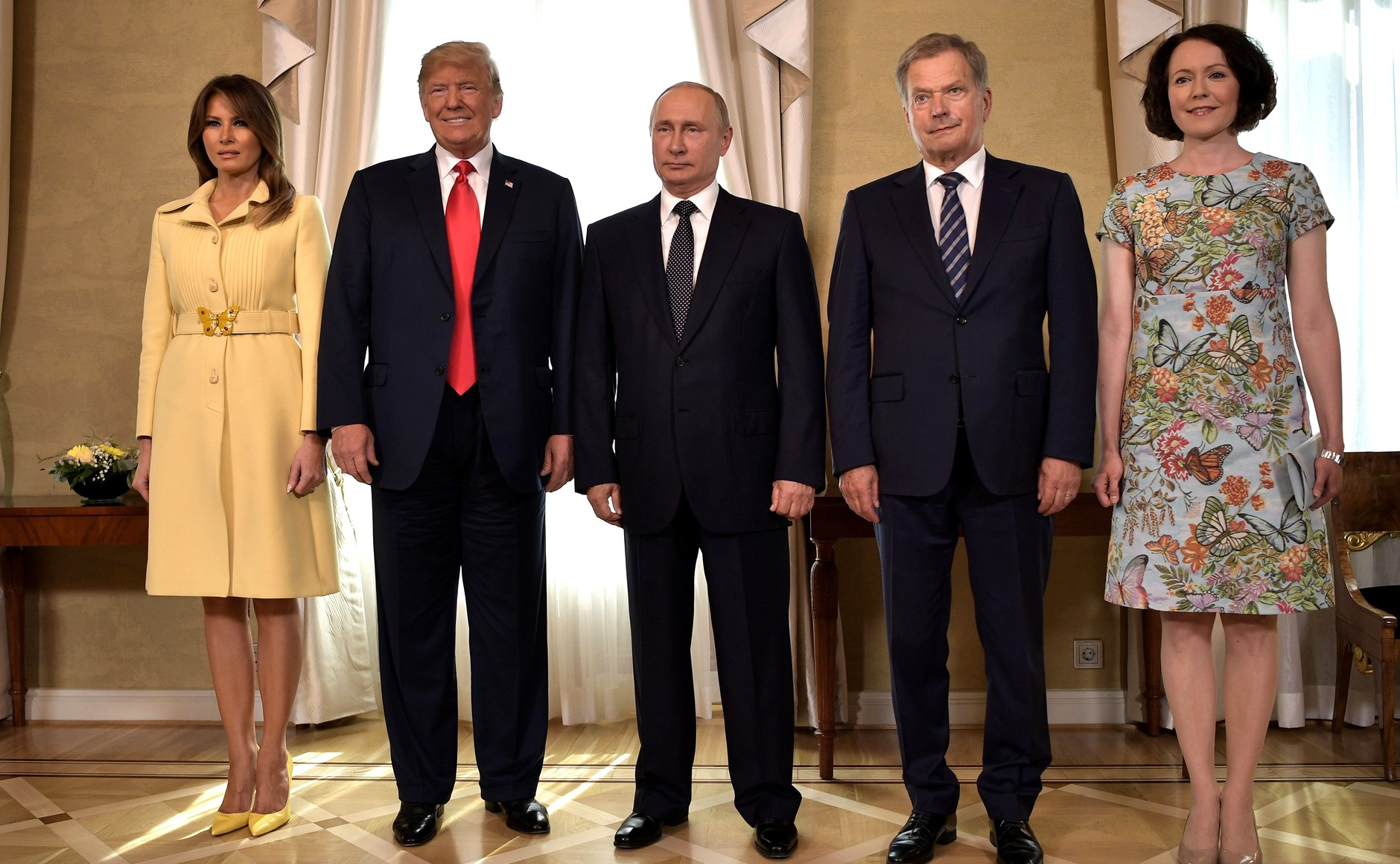
Joint photo session (left to right): First Lady of the US Melania Trump, US President Donald Trump, President of Russia Vladimir Putin, President of Finland Sauli Niinistö and First Lady of Finland Jenni Haukio

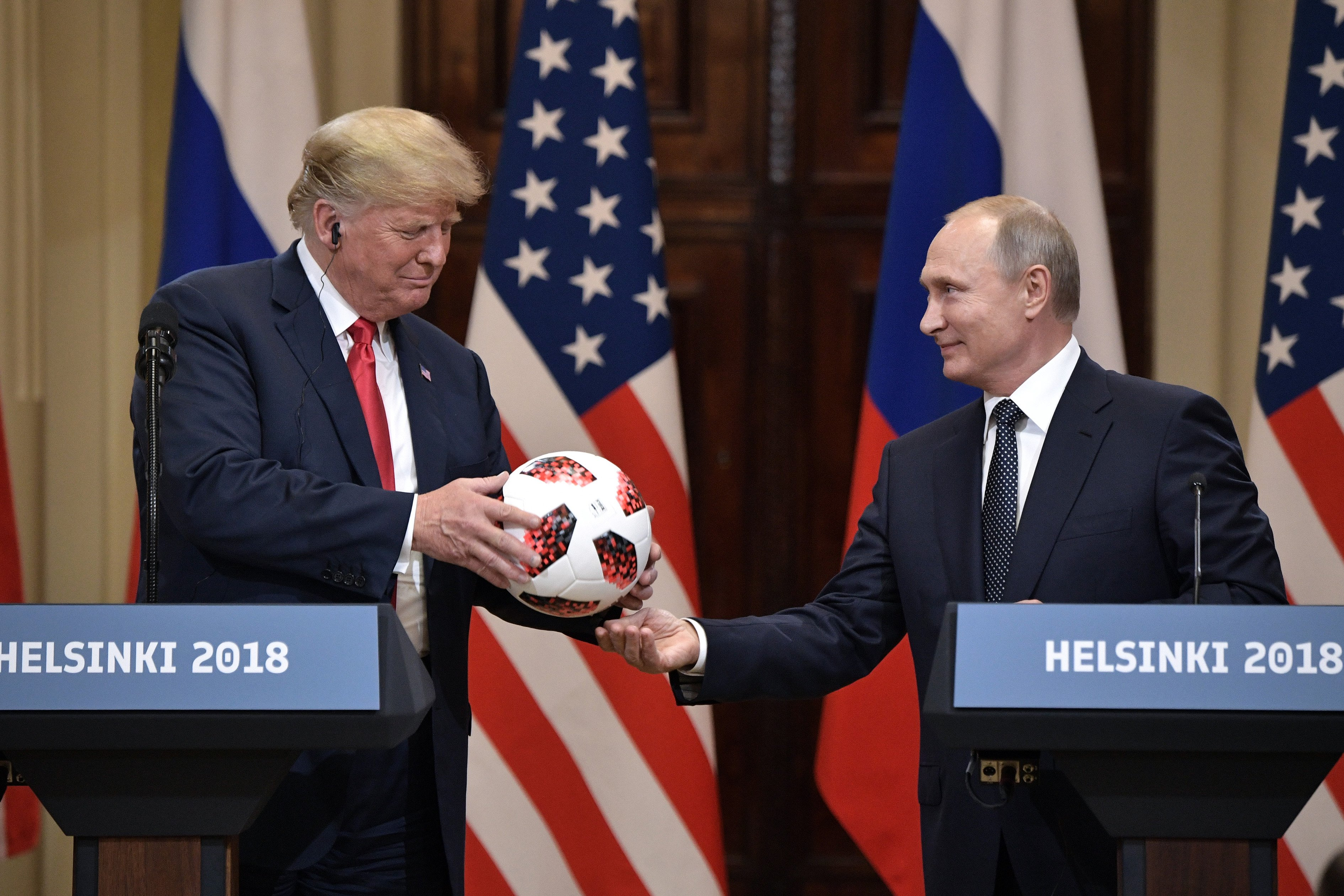
Putin gifts Trump a Telstar Mechta, the official match ball for the knockout stage of the 2018 FIFA World Cup

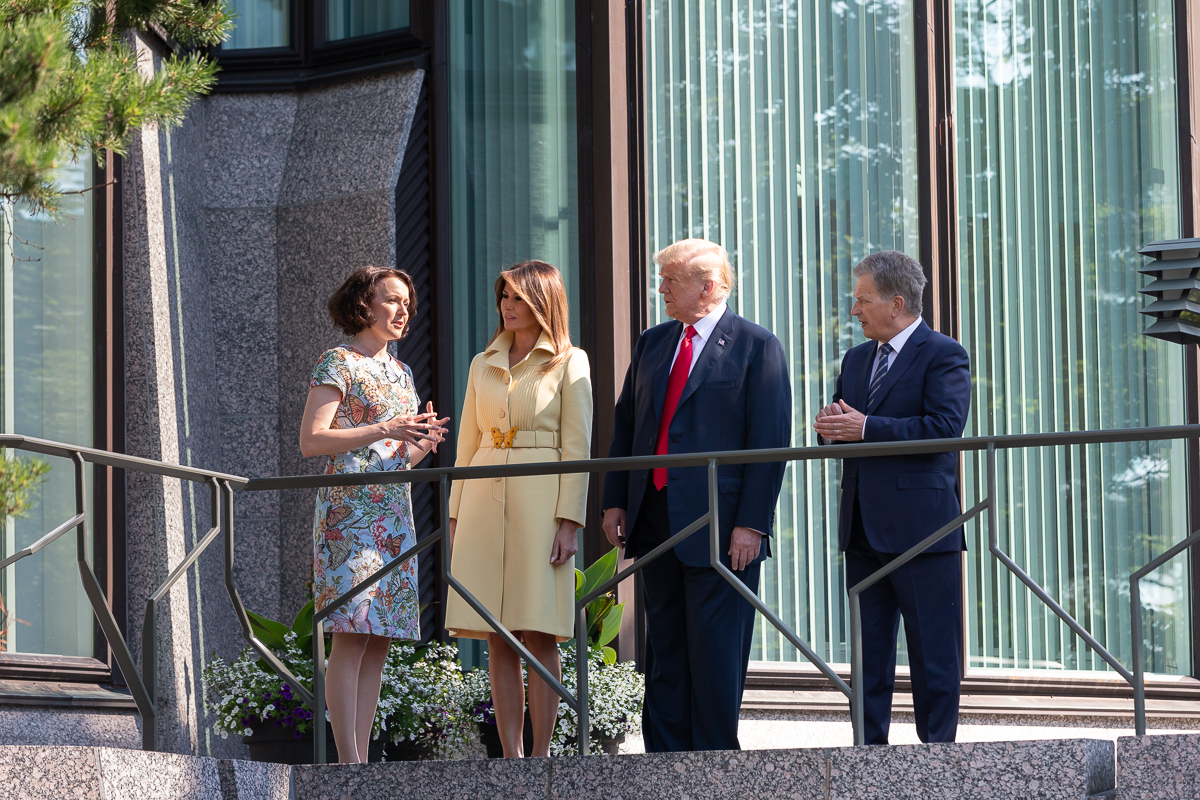
President Donald Trump and First Lady Melania Trump with President Sauli Niinistö and First Lady of Finland Jenni Haukio at the Mäntyniemi Residence

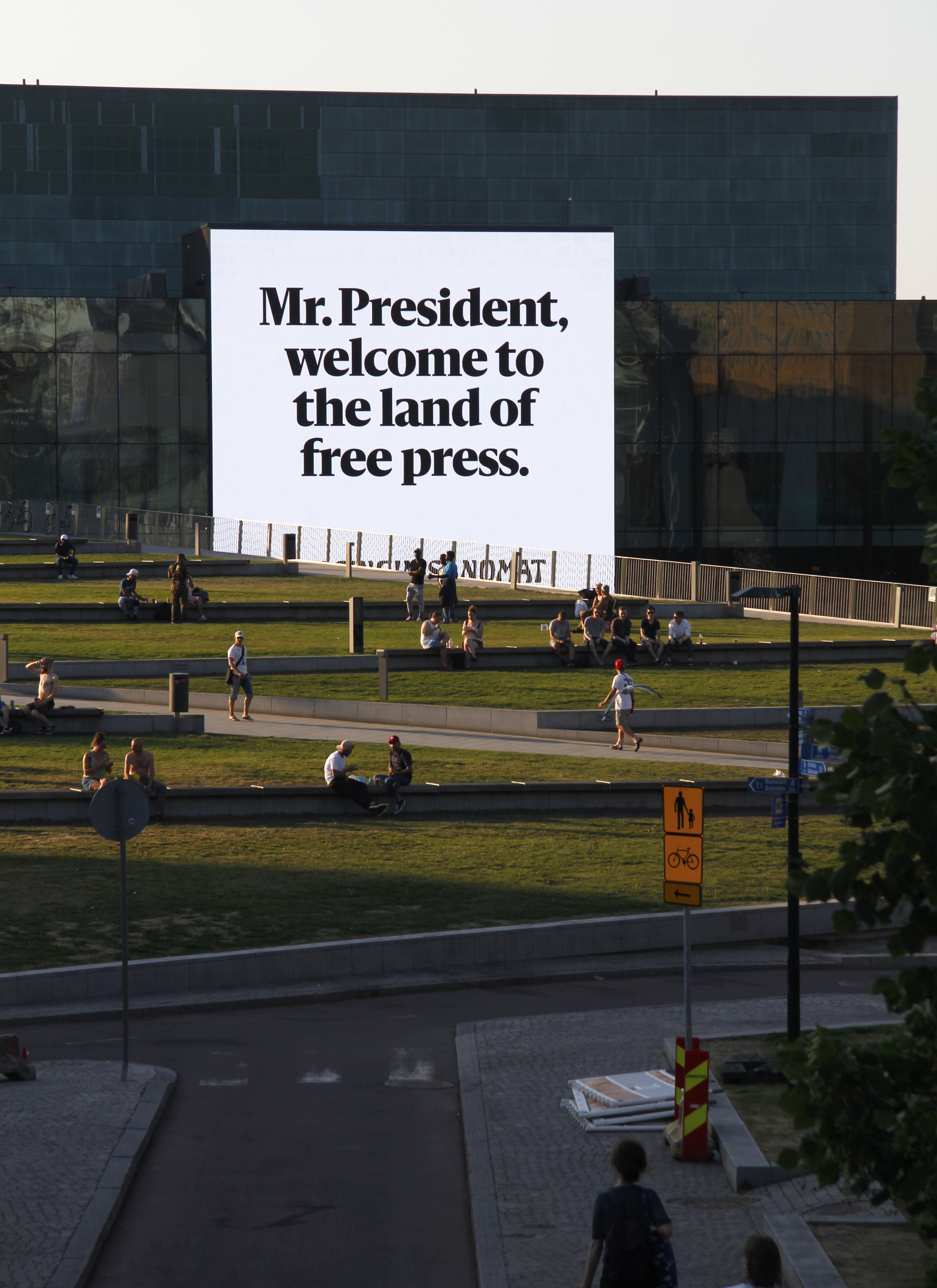
Advertisement in downtown Helsinki, with a message aimed at President Putin, in light of perceived lack of press freedom in Russia

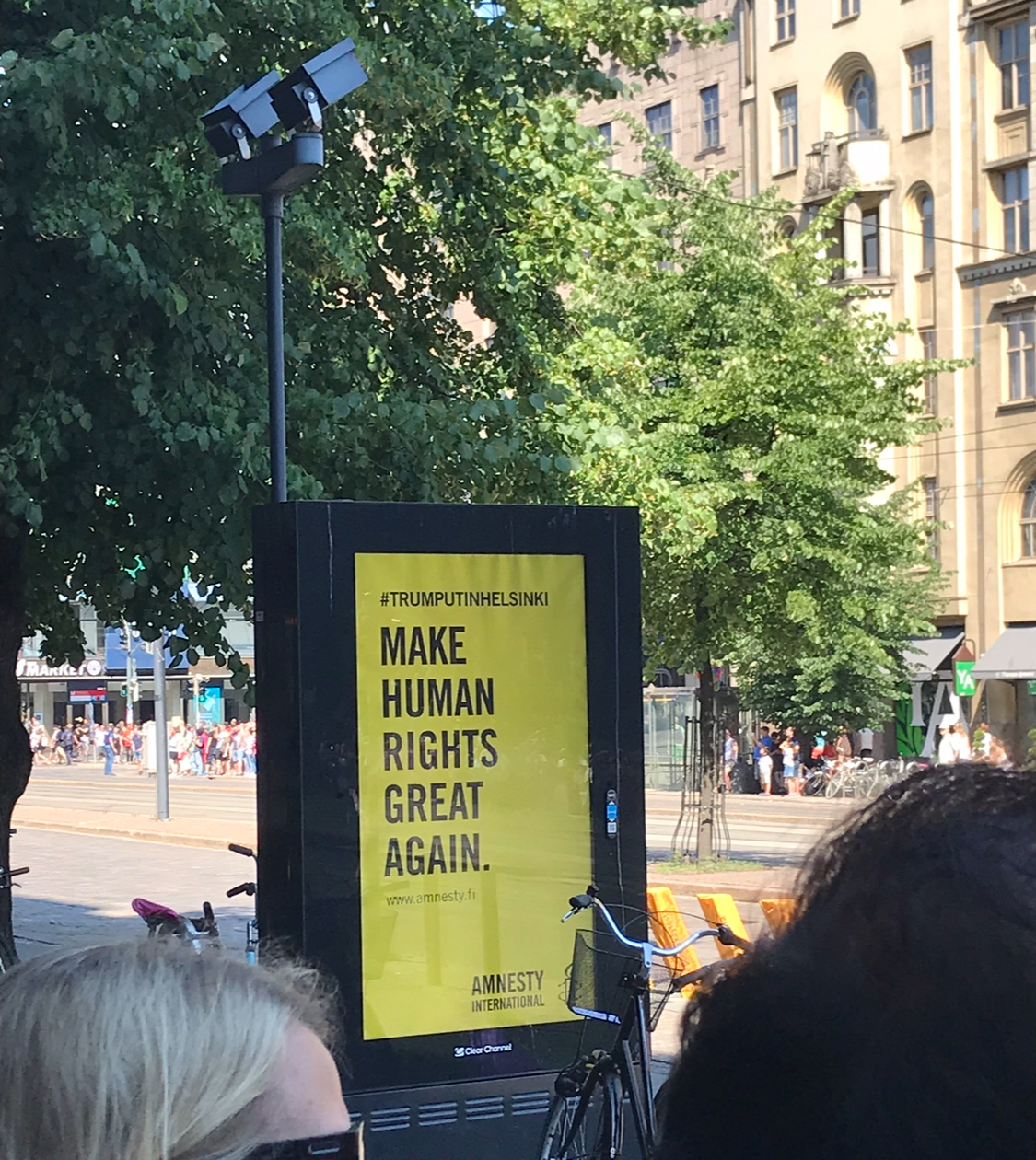
Advertisement by Amnesty International in downtown Helsinki

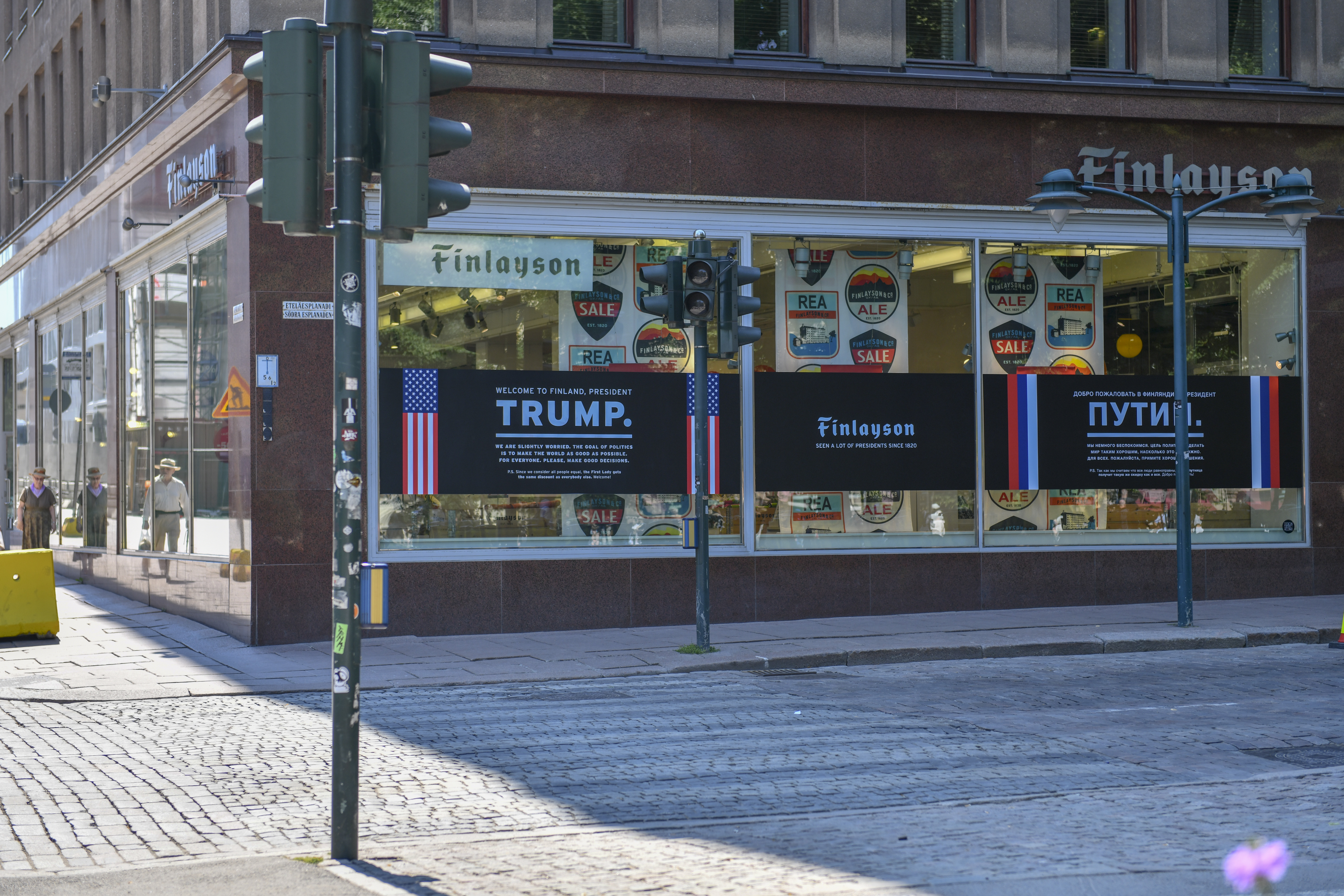
Trump and Putin's welcoming posters were visible in the street scene

== See also ==
- Détente
- List of Russia–United States summits
- List of Soviet Union–United States summits
- Foreign policy of the first Donald Trump administration § Russia
- 2025 Russia–United States summit in Alaska – Meeting between Donald Trump and Vladimir Putin in Alaska over Ukraine on August 15, 2025
- 2025 Budapest summit – Upcoming meeting between Donald Trump and Vladimir Putin in Hungary
