= Ami Perrin =

Genevan politician (c. 1500–1561)

- Born: c. 1500
- Died: 1561
- Occupations: Politician, military officer
- Known for: Leader of the "Libertine" faction; chief opponent of John Calvin's rule in Geneva
- Title: Captain-general of the city militia
- Spouse: Françoise Favre

Ami Perrin (c. 1500 – 1561) was a Genevan leader of the "Libertins" party and one of the most powerful figures in Geneva in the 16th century as chief opponent of religious reformer John Calvin's rule of the city.

[Ami Perrin] wanted to be elaborately dressed and to live well, and was not merely dainty in his eating, which means to desire little but the best, but dainty and gluttonous together, since he must have plenty of the best.

— François Bonivard

Perrin's father was a dealer in wooden vessels who later expanded into cloth retail and married the daughter of a thriving apothecary from Piedmont. Their only child, Ami, they fawned over and spoiled excessively. Perrin was associated with the Eidguenots, Geneva's anti-Savoyard party and in 1529 commanded a company against the Duke of Savoy. During the 1530s he was a partisan of Protestant reformist John Calvin, and a convinced "Guillermin", but considered himself poorly rewarded for this support. The Perrins were a prominent and wealthy Genevese family which strongly supported the independence of the city and invited Calvin back from Strasbourg in 1541. However, Perrin became disillusioned with Calvin's rule, specifically the large number of immigrants and foreign ministers, and was concerned that the Holy Roman Emperor, Charles V would capture the city as part of his campaign against the German princes. Perrin, who was at this point a man of great reputation and authority in Geneva, led the Libertine faction in the city which argued against Calvin's "insistence that church discipline should be enforced uniformly against all members of Genevan society". In 1547, Perrin was elected captain-general of the city's militia.

He married Françoise Favre, the daughter of François Favre, a merchant draper and former Eidguenot who was active on the Council and prosecuted in 1547 for accusing Calvin of proclaiming himself bishop of Geneva. Françoise appeared before the consistory (the congregation's governing body of elected officials) the same year, for the offence of dancing. Resisting the authority of Church elders, she claimed the right to punish her was reserved for her husband, Ami, who was in France representing the city before Henry II at the time. Returning to Geneva in September of that year, Perrin famously proclaimed before the court:

I understand that you are considering imprisoning my father-in-law and my wife. My said father-in-law is old, my wife is ill; by imprisoning them you will shorten their days, to my great regret, which I have not deserved, and which would be to give me poor recompense for the services I have done you. Therefore I beg you not to imprison them. If they have done wrong, I will bring them here to make such amends that you will have reason to be content. I pray you to grant me this, since if you put them in prison, God will aid me to avenge myself for it.

— Ami Perrin, quoted by François Bonivard

His petition was refused by the council, and he was accused of treason for allegedly offering to introduce a French garrison into Geneva to secure the city from attack by Charles V's troops in southern Germany. The subsequent lengthy trial and Perrin's acquittal and restoration to office reflected badly on the Calvinists. Perrin and his allies were elected to the town council in 1548, and "broadened their support base in Geneva by stirring up resentment among the older inhabitants against the increasing number of religious refugees who were fleeing France in even greater numbers". By 1555, Calvinists were firmly in place on the Genevan town council, so the Libertines, led by Perrin, responded with an attempted coup against the government and called for the massacre of the French. The revolt was unsuccessful as the forces of Calvin triumphed, and Perrin was sentenced in absentia to have his right hand cut off. In the words of historian Jonathan Zophy, Perrin's uprising was "the last great political challenge Calvin had to face in Geneva." Calvin would later describe Perrin as "our comic Caesar".

== See also ==
- Reformation in Switzerland
