= Moscow Summit (1998) =

Meeting between Bill Clinton and Boris Yeltsin

The Moscow Summit of 1998 was a summit meeting happened on September 1–2, 1998, between President of the United States Bill Clinton and President of Russia Boris Yeltsin. The Moscow summit meeting addressed a number of important nonproliferation and arms control issues where the presidents of both countries discussed common security concerns and agreed to give each other's countries continuous information on launches of ballistic missiles in order to increase the safety of the population and reduce the possibility of nuclear war by mistake.
