= Parc La Grange =

Lakeside manor on the outskirts of Geneva

Coordinates: 46.206°N 6.167°E

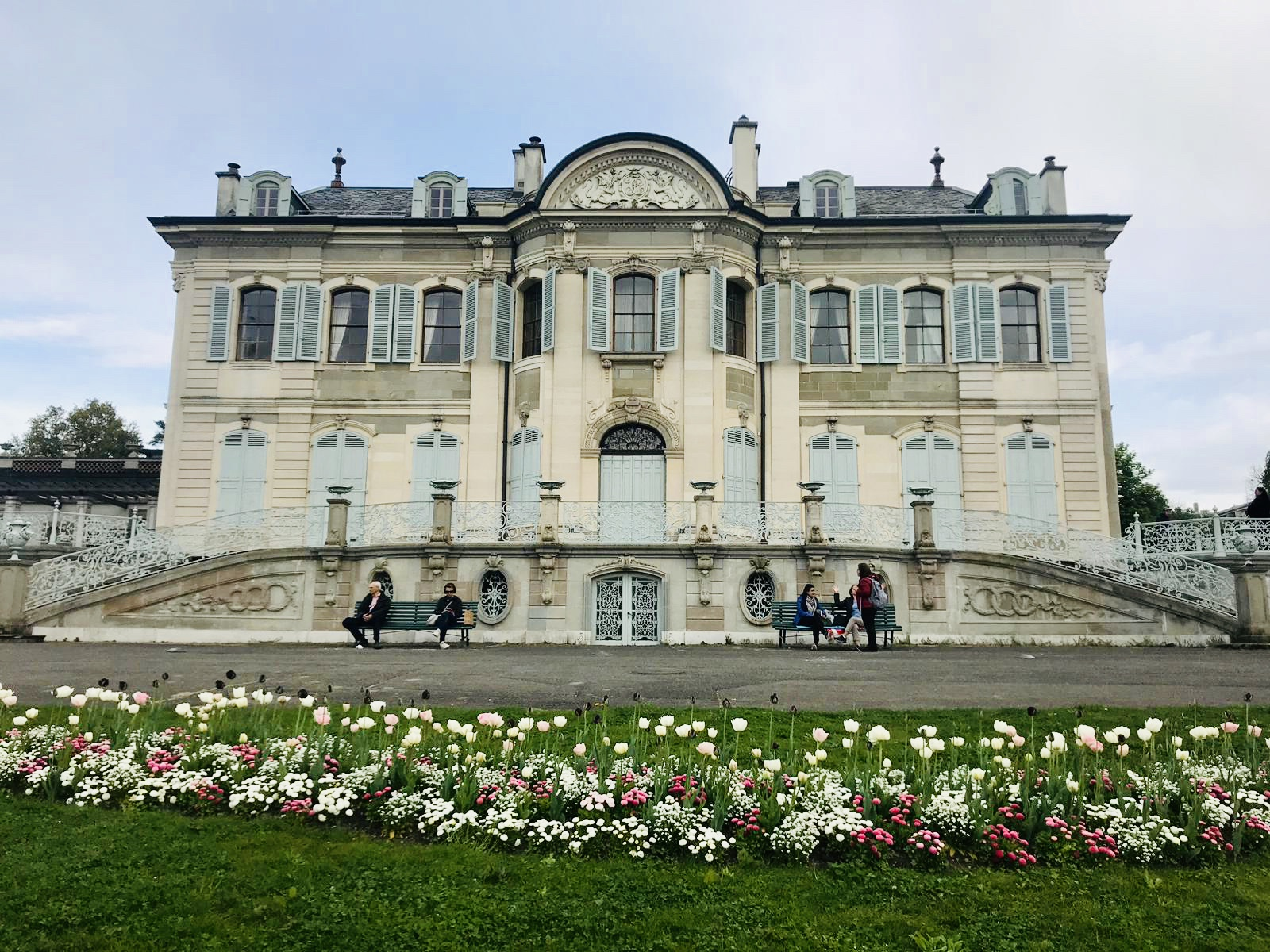
The Villa La Grange

The Parc La Grange is an urban park in the city of Geneva, Switzerland.

The city park is located south of Lake Geneva at the Quai Gustave-Ador in Geneva. It has a surface of 200,000 m^{2} and hosts very old and tall trees, Geneva's biggest rose garden, orangeries, an alpine garden and an 18th-century villa. Also two theaters, a playground as well as a paddling pool for the children are found there.

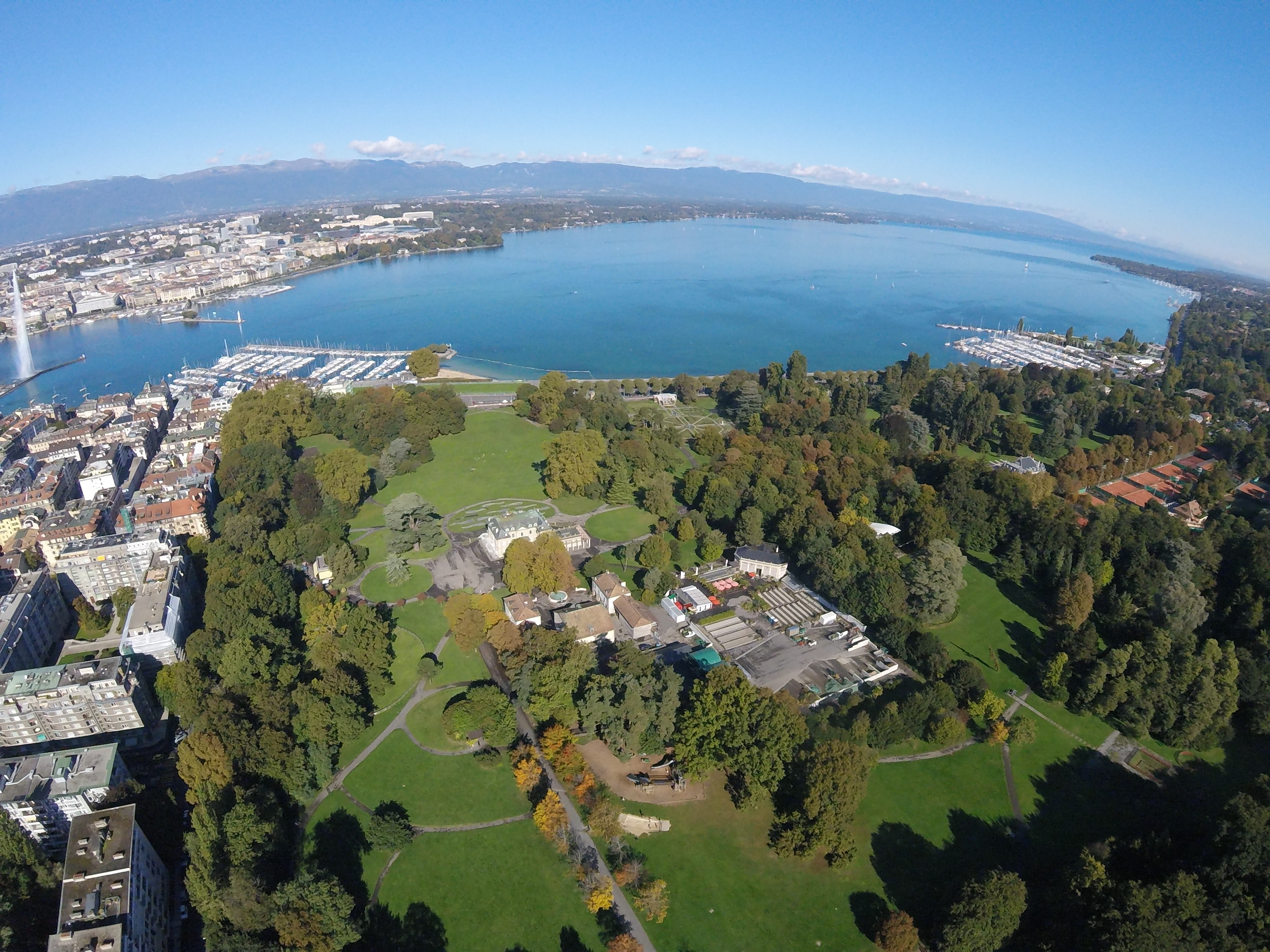
Aerial view of the park

== History ==
In 1864 a meeting of the first conference of the International Committee of the Red Cross was held in the villa La Grange on the invitation of its owner, Edmond Favre (1812-1880).

William Favre (1843-1918), a son of Edmond Favre, bequested the La Grange area to the city of Geneva, in 1918.

On June 10, 1969 Pope Paul VI celebrated during his visit of Geneva at La Grange a mass with some 70,000 people present in the park.

On June 16, 2021, a summit between US president Joe Biden and Russian president Vladimir Putin was held at the Villa La Grange. Guy Parmelin, President of Switzerland, greeted Joe Biden and Vladimir Putin wishing them a useful meeting.

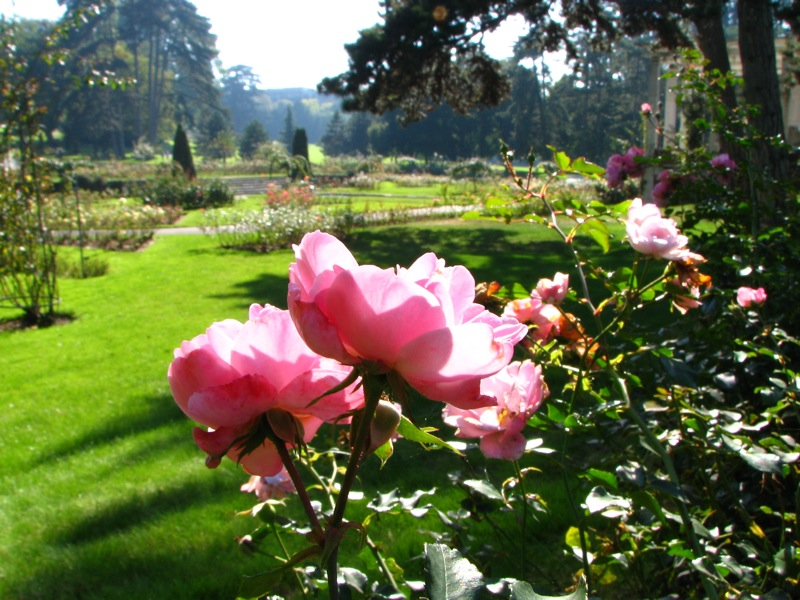
La Grange rose garden

== La Grange library ==
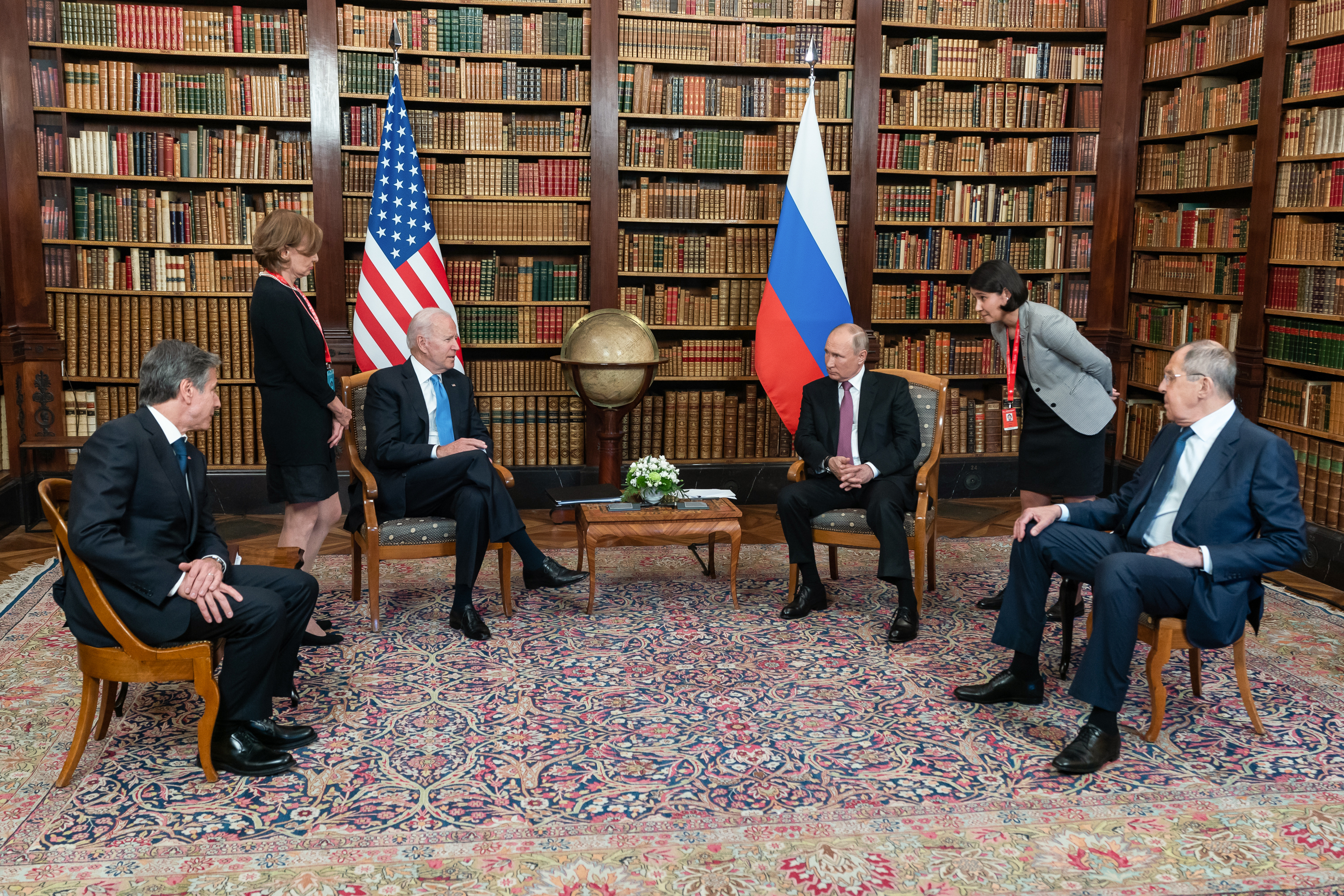
Joe Biden and Vladimir Putin, in the library of the villa (16 June 2021)

In the villa La Grange there are some rooms for the rich library with more than 12,000 old books which today are a precious part of the Bibliothèque de Genève.

The book collection was created by the scholar and owner of La Grange Guillaume Favre (1770-1851).

A portrait of the library's creator Guillaume Favre is part of the Geneva Musée d'Art et d'Histoire collection.

== See also ==
- 2021 Russia–United States summit
