= Alphonse Favre =

Swiss geologist (1815–1890)

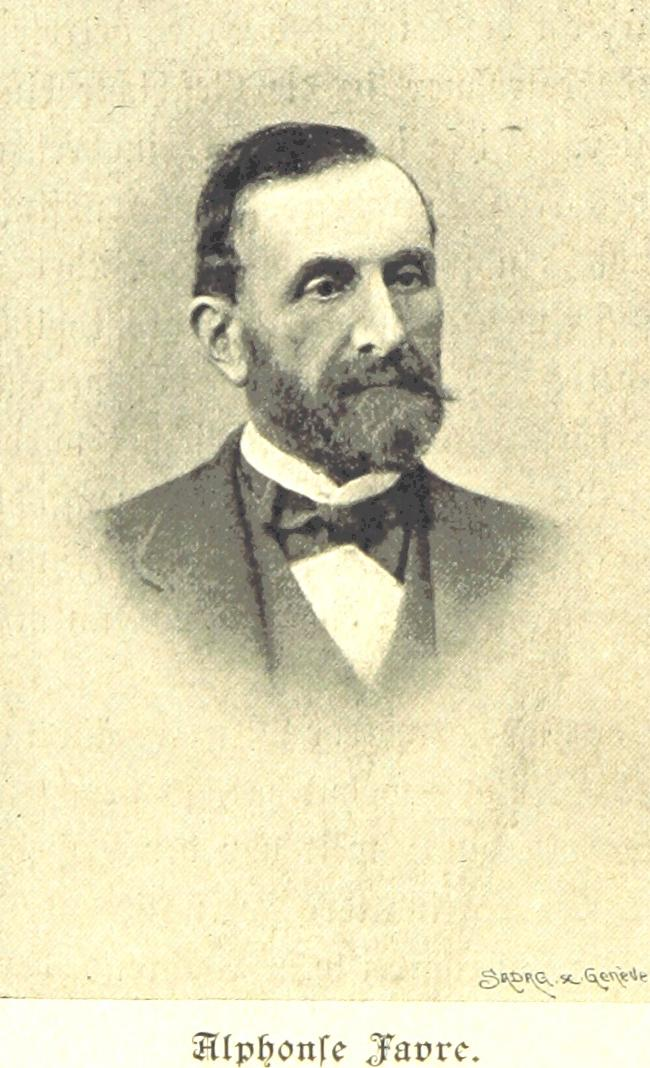
Alphonse Favre

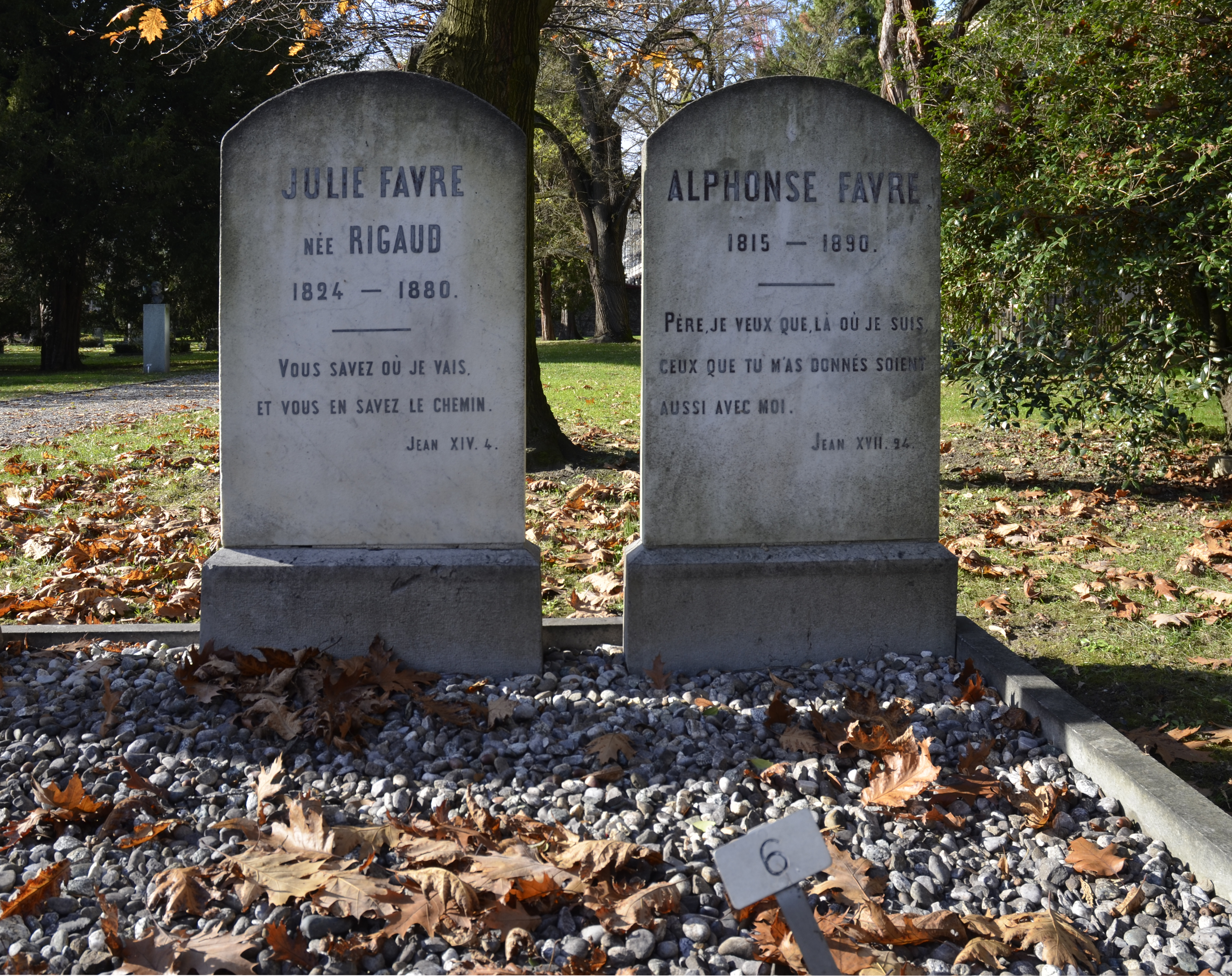
Tomb of Alphonse and Julie Favre, born Rigaud, Kings Cemetery, Geneva.

Jean Alphonse Favre (31 March 1815 in Geneva – 11 July 1890 in Pregny) was a Swiss geologist. He was a pioneer of alpine geology and became director of the Swiss Geological Commission (Schweizerische Geologische Kommission), which was charged with creating the geological map of Switzerland.

He studied natural sciences at the Academy of Geneva (1831–37), then chemistry and mineralogy in Paris (1839). From 1844 to 1852 he taught classes in geology and paleontology at the Academy of Geneva, where he was a professor for many years.

In 1888, he was elected as a member to the American Philosophical Society.

He specialized in geological research of the Savoy and Mont Blanc, that included studies of ancient glaciers associated with those regions. His explanation of the geological structure showed that certain anomalous incidents of fossils were due to recurring interfoldings of the strata and to complex overthrust faults.

== Selected works ==
- Remarques sur les anthracites des Alpes, 1841 – Remarks on anthracites of the Alps.
- Considérations géologiques sur le mont Salève, et sur les terrains des environs de Genève, 1843 – Geological considerations on Mount Salève, and the land surrounding Geneva.
- Observations sur la position relative des terrains des Alpes suisses occidentales et des Alpes de la Savoie, 1847 – Observations on the relative position of the terrain of the western Swiss Alps and the Alps of Savoy.
- Essai sur la géologie des montagnes placées entre la chaîne du Jura et le lac de Genève, 1850 – Essay on the geology of the mountains located between the Jura chain and Lake Geneva.
- Mémoire sur les terrains liasique et keupérien de la Savoie, 1859 – On the Liassic and Keuperian terrain of Savoy.
- Recherches géologiques dans les parties de la Savoie, du Piémont et de la Suisse voisines du Mont-Blanc, 1867 – Geological research involving parts of Savoy, the Piedmont and the Swiss environs of Mont Blanc.
- H.-B. de Saussure et les Alpes, 1870 – Horace-Bénédict de Saussure and the Alps.
- Description géologie du canton de Genève (with Eugène Risler, 1879) – Geological description of the canton of Geneva.

== Honours ==
Favre Bjerg in Greenland was named after him by fellow Swiss geologist Heinrich Bütler (1893–1983).
