= Nothing about Ukraine without Ukraine =

Foreign policy principle

"Nothing about Ukraine without Ukraine" is a foreign policy principle that became relevant during the Russian–Ukrainian War, especially after Russia's full-scale invasion of Ukraine on February 24, 2022. The expanded meaning of the phrase is that there can be no negotiations (for example, on a ceasefire during the Russian–Ukrainian war) without the participation of Ukraine at the negotiating table. (Note: In agreement with the Budapest Memorandum, in which, the Russian Federation, the United Kingdom of Great Britain and Northern Ireland and the United States of America reaffirm their commitment [...] to respect the independence and sovereignty and the existing borders of Ukraine; [...] reaffirm their obligation to refrain from the threat or use of force against the territorial integrity or political independence of Ukraine, and [...] reaffirm their commitment [...] to refrain from economic coercion designed to subordinate to their own interest the exercise by Ukraine of the rights inherent in its sovereignty and thus to secure advantages of any kind.)

This statement is a special case of the formula "Nothing about us without us", known since the 16th century in Central Europe, when the Kingdom of Poland adopted the "Nihil novi" Law, which prohibited kings from passing new laws without the consent of the nobility.

== Before the full-scale Russian invasion ==
The formulation "Nothing about Ukraine without Ukraine" repeatedly appeared in the process of attempts to peacefully resolve the war in Donbass since 2014 in the format of the Normandy Four.

For example, on March 29, 2021, in response to information about preparations for a trilateral videoconference between Russian President Vladimir Putin and other leaders of the Normandy Format, German Chancellor Angela Merkel and French President Emmanuel Macron, without the participation of Ukraine, official spokesman of the Ukrainian Foreign Ministry Oleg Nikolenko stated: "Our position is clear: nothing about Ukraine without Ukraine. Only the full 'Normandy format' opens up the prospect of progress in resolving the Russian-Ukrainian armed conflict". Atlantic Council Fellow Peter Dickinson confirmed Nikolenko's words: "'Nothing about Ukraine without Ukraine' has remained one of the cornerstones of Kyiv's approach to peace negotiations since hostilities began seven years ago."

The formulation "Nothing about Ukraine without Ukraine" was announced by US Secretary of State Antony Blinken a month before Russia's full-scale invasion of Ukraine. On January 11, 2022, head of the Office of the President of Ukraine Andriy Yermak at a meeting with leading European media: "We have received assurances from U.S. President Joe Biden and all our Western partners that any issues concerning our country and its security will not be discussed without its participation. And during any negotiations the 'nothing about Ukraine without Ukraine' principle will be adhered to."

== After the full-scale Russian invasion ==
=== Position of Western leaders ===
On May 31, 2022 US President Joe Biden published a policy article in The New York Times, "What America will and will not do in Ukraine", where he stated:

My principle throughout this crisis has been "Nothing about Ukraine without Ukraine." I will not pressure the Ukrainian government — in private or public — to make any territorial concessions. It would be wrong and contrary to well-settled principles to do so.

German Chancellor Olaf Scholz wrote on Twitter on June 22, 2022: "Ukraine – and only Ukraine – decides what suits them. Nothing about Ukraine without Ukraine! We are far from negotiating with Russia because Putin believes in a dictated peace. Therefore, it is all the more important that we stick to the course."

Biden repeated the same principle at a press conference at the G20 Summit in Bali in November 2022: "... we are not going to engage in any negotiation (on a compromise between Russia and Ukraine). There's no — nothing about Ukraine without Ukraine. This is a decision Ukraine has to make."

Biden's successor Donald Trump reversed the policy by holding talks on Ukraine directly with Russia, without the involvement of the Ukrainian leadership.

On February 19, 2025 Canadian Prime Minister Justin Trudeau said when asked about the U.S.-Russia meeting in Saudi Arabia during a news conference on Wednesday: "It's a fundamental principle for Canada, and for the vast majority of our allies, that nothing about Ukraine without Ukraine"

=== NATO position ===
On July 12, 2023 NATO Secretary General Jens Stoltenberg at the closing press conference of the 2023 NATO Summit in Vilnius stated: "... negotiations to solve the conflict in Ukraine will only happen when Ukraine is ready for negotiations. And as we have stated again and again, nothing about Ukraine without Ukraine."

=== Ukraine's position ===
On August 5–6, 2023, at the peace summit, which was held in Jeddah, Saudi Arabia, and was attended by representatives of about 40 countries, including China, India, the United States and Ukraine, the representative of Ukraine said: "There is no reason to doubt that the principle 'Nothing about Ukraine without Ukraine' is being disrupted."

Throughout the conflict this formulation appears from time to time in the information space in the context of refuting rumors about possible negotiations behind Ukraine's back.
