= February 2025 Putin–Trump phone call =

Call between presidents of Russia and the US

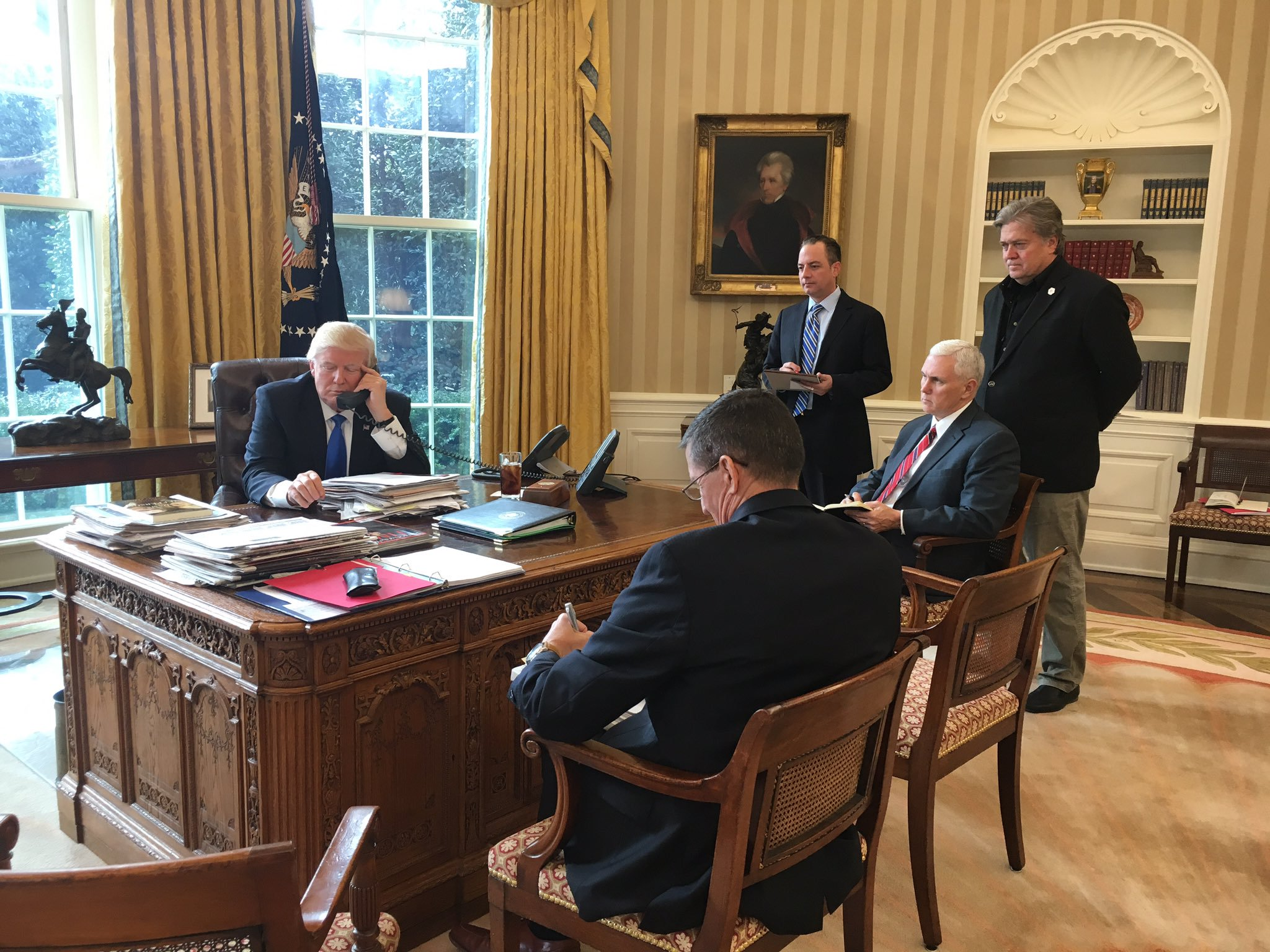
- Donald Trump speaks on the phone with Vladimir Putin on January 28, 2017.
- Host country: United States; Russia
- Date: February 12, 2025
- Participants: (United States) Donald Trump; (Russia) Vladimir Putin
- Follows: Second inauguration of Donald Trump
- Precedes: 2025 Russia–United States Summit

A formal telephone conversation between U.S. president Donald Trump and Russian president Vladimir Putin took place on February 12, 2025. The conversation is said to have lasted an hour and a half, and was the first direct exchange of views between the leaders of the Russian Federation and the United States since the Russian invasion of Ukraine in February 2022.

According to a detailed statement posted by Donald Trump on his Truth Social social media account, the conversation covered a wide range of topics, including the situation in Ukraine, in the Middle East, artificial intelligence, energy, and the strength of the U.S. dollar, among other issues.

== Background ==
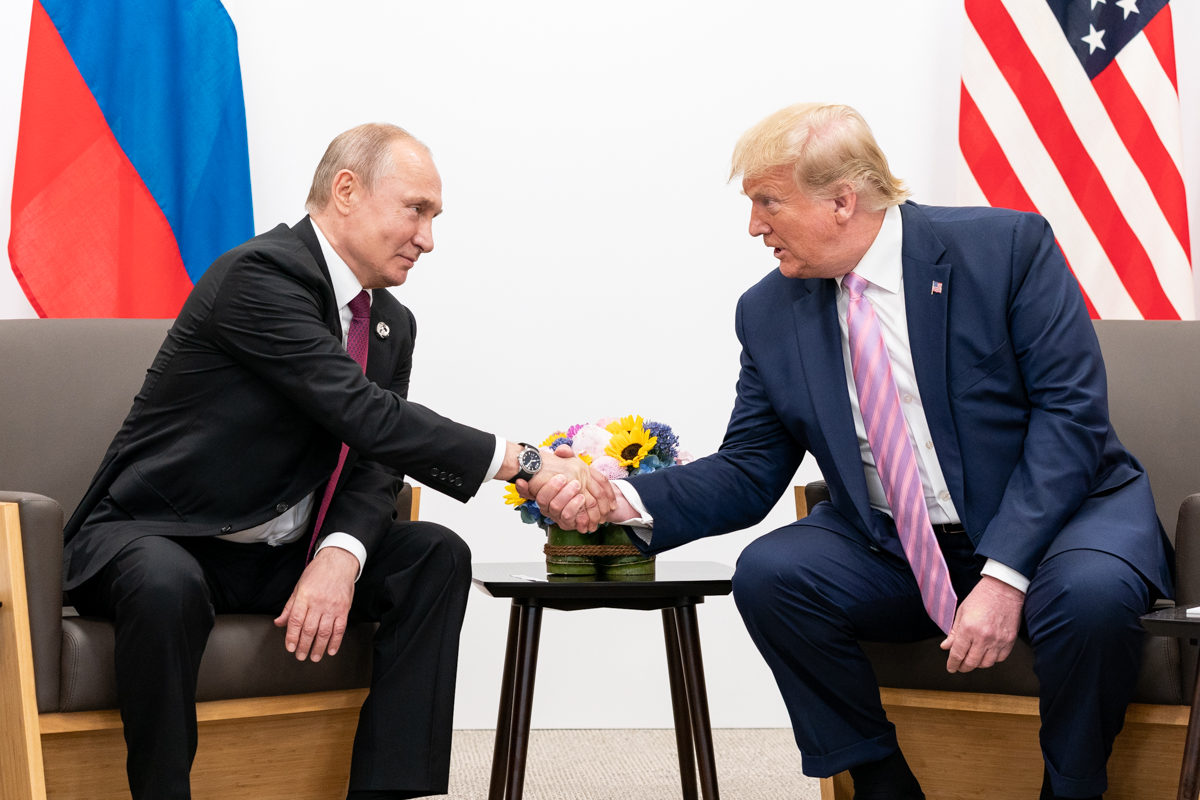
Russian president Vladimir Putin and American president Donald Trump at the G20 Summit in Osaka, 2019

On November 7, 2024, Vladimir Putin congratulated Donald Trump on his victory in the 2024 US elections, and added that his desire towards ending the Russo-Ukrainian war "deserves attention".

On November 9, Donald Trump's adviser Bryan Lanza stated that the US presidential administration would focus on a "realistic vision for peace" in Ukraine, instead of insisting on the returning of Crimea.

On February 11, 2025, United States Special Envoy to the Middle East Steven Witkoff arrived in Moscow to arrange the exchange of American citizen Marc Fogel for Russian citizen Alexander Vinnik. Fox News claimed that during his visit, Witkoff met with President of Russia Vladimir Putin, which was subsequently neither officially confirmed nor denied by the Kremlin. US presidential administration officials stated that the prisoner exchange could be a harbinger of resumed efforts to end the conflict between Russia and Ukraine.

On February 12, at a meeting at the headquarters of NATO in Brussels, United States secretary of defense Pete Hegseth stated that the United States wouldn't support Ukraine's aspirations for NATO membership, and stated that it was "unrealistic" to push for a return to Ukraine's pre-war borders based on the situation on the ground.

== Course of conversation ==
On February 12, 2025, a formal telephone conversation took place between Trump and Putin. According to official statements, the conversation lasted about an hour and a half and was described by the American side as "lengthy and very productive". During the conversation, the leaders discussed a number of issues, the central one being the Russian invasion of Ukraine.

Following the conversation, President Trump announced an agreement to begin immediate negotiations to end military action in Ukraine. Both sides expressed their intention to work "very closely" to find a diplomatic solution to the conflict.

Subsequently, Trump instructed US secretary of state Marco Rubio, National Security Advisor Michael Waltz, CIA director John Ratcliffe, and Special Envoy to the Middle East Steve Witkoff to lead the peace negotiations.

Kremlin press secretary Dmitry Peskov confirmed the conversation and reported that during the conversation, Vladimir Putin pointed out "the need to eliminate the root causes of the conflict". Peskov also revealed that mutual invitations were exchanged between the leaders to meet in each other's nations, emphasizing Trump's invitation to Moscow.

== Consequences ==
Donald Trump announced an upcoming personal meeting with Vladimir Putin in Saudi Arabia.

Advisor to the president of Ukraine Dmitry Litvin stated that the US president, after talking with the head of the Russian Federation, had a telephone conversation with Volodymyr Zelenskyy. Trump shared details of his conversation with Vladimir Putin and agreed to immediately begin peace talks.

The foreign ministers of Ukraine, France, Germany, the United Kingdom, Italy, Spain, Poland, as well as the head of the European External Action Service, following a meeting in Paris, spoke in support of Ukraine and spoke about the mandatory participation of the EU in the negotiation process.

On February 13, 2025, the Moscow Exchange (MOEX) rose by over 6 percent to reach 3,210 points following news of the conversation. Simultaneously, the RTS Index also increased by over 6 percent, reaching 1,080 points. The ruble rose by 3.7 percent to reach 90.50 rubles against the U.S. dollar.

On February 18, American delegates led by Marco Rubio and Russian delegates led by Sergey Lavrov met in Saudi Arabia.

== Responses ==
=== Media and analysis ===
According to CNN, the telephone conversation between Putin and Trump, along with the Pentagon's statements about European NATO members bearing their own military expenses, marked a significant change in American-European relations. The publication noted that Trump's position reflects his "America First" policy and his desire to evaluate international relations from the point of view of financial gain. The Washington Post emphasized that the interests of European countries in the geopolitical defense space were fading into the background.

The BBC noted that a possible mutual visit between the leaders would mark a fundamental shift in bilateral relations, given that the president of the United States hadn't visited Russia in over a decade. Axios described the phone call, the possible meeting between the leaders, and the previously announced prisoner exchange as signs of a thawing of frozen US-Russian relations.

The New York Times described the phone call as a turning point for Putin, comparable in significance to the key battles in the Russian invasion of Ukraine.

According to The Guardian, the rapid initiation of negotiations with Russia and the open demands for Ukraine to cede territory have caused alarm in Kyiv and among Ukraine's European allies. They have expressed fears that the Trump administration may make significant concessions to Putin's demands as means of securing a quick deal. Al Jazeera described the developments as having "signalled a major shift in three years of US policy towards Kyiv".

According to The Times, the 90-minute conversation was proof of the failure of attempts by European and Western powers to isolate Russia and turn Putin into an international pariah with economic sanctions and diplomatic pressure. Süddeutsche Zeitung noted that Trump rejected the European position on the inadmissibility of deciding Ukraine's fate without the participation of Ukraine itself and European partners, emphasizing that only two participants would be present at the proposed negotiating table: Trump and Putin. According to Bloomberg, European officials received no advance notice of the upcoming conversation, and were shocked that it took place. Handelsblatt noted that EU leaders feared that Trump may be prepared to make significant concessions to Putin at the expense of Europe.

=== Domestic ===
United States secretary of defense Pete Hegseth, commenting on the conversation, emphasized that the desire for peace was not a "betrayal" of Ukraine, and noted that Russian aggression served as a "reset" for NATO. However, Donald Trump's former national security advisor John Bolton said that Trump "effectively surrendered" to Putin on the issue of Ukraine.

US secretary of state Marco Rubio said that "One phone call does not solve a war as complex as this one. But I can tell you that Donald Trump is the only leader in the world that could potentially begin that process."

== Later calls ==
Later calls between Putin and Trump were made in March 18, May 19, June 4, June 14, July 3, August 18 (August 19 night Moscow Time), October 16. The August phone talk was preceded by the talks in person during the August 15 Alaska Summit.

== See also ==
- 2025 Russia–United States summit in Hungary
