= August 2025 White House multilateral meeting on Ukraine =

Meeting between European leaders and the U.S. president over Ukraine on August 18, 2025

White House multilateral meeting on Ukraine August 2025 European-US summit
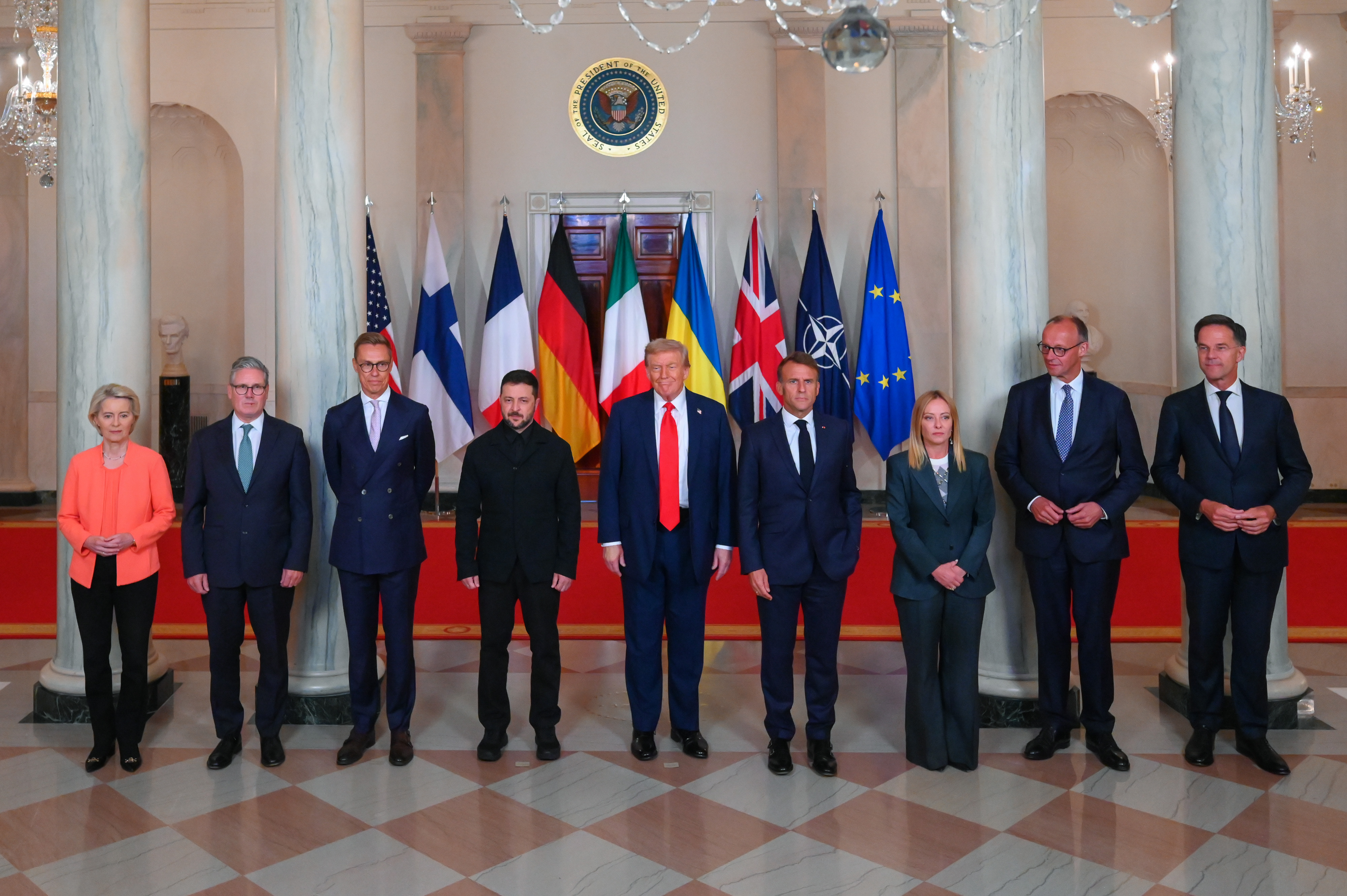
- Ursula von der Leyen, Keir Starmer, Alexander Stubb, Volodymyr Zelensky, Donald Trump, Emmanuel Macron, Giorgia Meloni, Friedrich Merz, Mark Rutte (pictured L-R)
- Host country: United States
- Date: August 18, 2025
- City: Washington, D.C.
- Venue: White House
- Participants: (in diplomatic protocol order): (Note: According to flags precedence order from left to right in the family photo (above). Pictured leaders' line-up order of precedence, if different, is in superscript.): Donald Trump; Alexander Stubb; Emmanuel Macron; Friedrich Merz; Giorgia Meloni; Volodymyr Zelenskyy; Keir Starmer; Mark Rutte; Ursula von der Leyen
- Chair: Donald J. Trump
- President: President of the US
- Follows: inaugural
- Precedes: January 2026 multilateral meeting on Ukraine (Note: As discussed on 22 November 2025)

Key points
- § Aftermath of the Russia-US summit; § Security guarantees for Ukraine; Russia-Ukraine or/and Russia-Ukraine-US summit/s possibility; Next meeting January, 2026 Note

On August 18, 2025, a hurried summit of eight European leaders convened at the White House to discuss the aftermath of the 2025 Russia–United States summit in Alaska. Robust security guarantees for Ukraine akin to Article 5 of the North Atlantic Treaty were the primary topic on the agenda.

== Background ==
=== Russia–United States summit ===
Three days before, the Russia–United States Summit between US President Donald Trump and Russian President Vladimir Putin took place. The main topic of discussion was the ongoing Russo-Ukrainian War.

=== Meeting with Zelenskyy ===
The full meeting with Zelenskyy

Trump met with Ukrainian President Volodymyr Zelenskyy before meeting other European leaders. At the press conference immediately preceding the Trump–Zelenskyy meeting, Zelenskyy personally handed over a letter from his wife, Olena Zelenska, to US first lady Melania Trump, thanking her for efforts to secure the return of Ukrainian children held in Russia.

Zelenskyy, unlike during their February meeting, spoke briefly, facing fewer questions, one of which touched elections in Ukraine. He again underscored that conducting elections under wartime martial law was impossible.

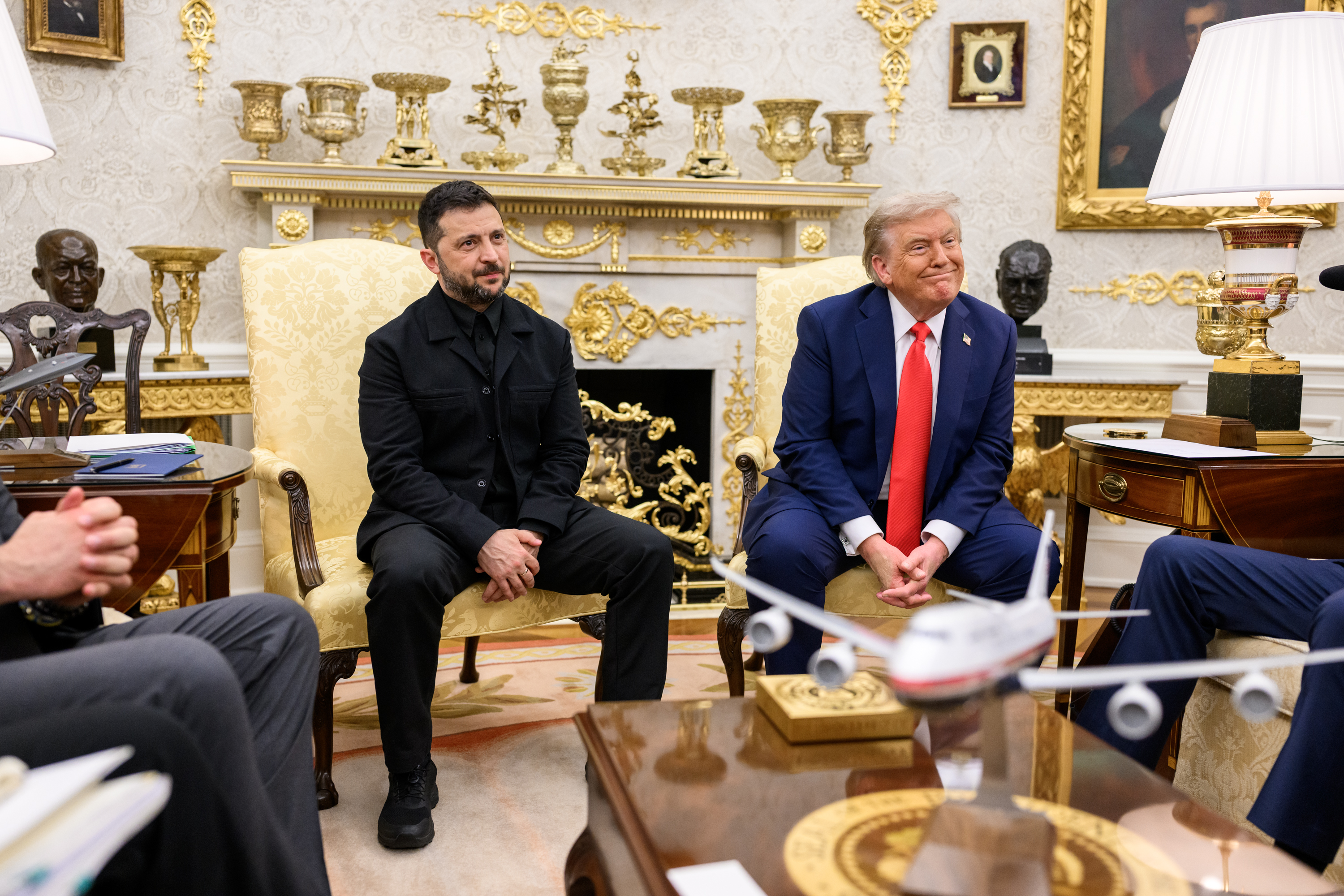
President Donald Trump participates in a bilateral meeting with President Volodymyr Zelenskyy of Ukraine, Monday, August 18, 2025, in the Oval Office. (Official White House Photo)

Trump was asked about his earlier claim that Zelenskyy could end the war "immediately". Trump answered that he still believes this, and that there was a good chance of producing a settlement during a future three-way meeting with Russia, Ukraine, and the United States. Zelenskyy said he also wanted such a meeting to take place.

Trump said the United States would offer Ukraine strong security protection but left open whether it would be NATO-led or take another form of US involvement.

Trump reiterated that he didn't think a ceasefire was necessary for a peace treaty. This marked a notable shift from Trump's stance before his meeting with Putin the previous week. Before the Russia–United States Summit, he had said that he wanted a ceasefire "rapidly" and had threatened Russia with economic sanctions if one was not agreed on.

Zelenskyy said Ukraine can purchase US weapons with support from European countries and other financing programs. He stressed that strengthening and rearming the country's armed forces is vital.

Trump blamed his predecessor, former US President Joe Biden, for failing to prevent Russia's 2022 invasion of Ukraine, and continued to falsely claim that the 2020 election was "stolen" from him; he also spoke about extemporaneously mail-in voting, transgender athletes, and crime in Washington, D.C.

== Meeting ==
The summit took place on short notice. According to the BBC, it was "unprecedented in modern times for so many world leaders to be [at the White House] at once." Several leaders, including Italian Prime Minister Giorgia Meloni and European Commission President Ursula von der Leyen, proposed security guarantees for Ukraine along the lines of NATO's collective-defense clause, under which an attack on one is treated as an attack on all.

Trump at one point paused the meeting to brief Russian President Vladimir Putin for forty minutes over his Oval Office phone. The other participants took their intermission in the Roosevelt Room.

After the meeting, President Emmanuel Macron of France stressed that security guarantees involved the security of "the whole of the European continent". German Chancellor Friedrich Merz remarked to the press that "The Russian demand that Kyiv give up the free parts of Donbass corresponds, to put it bluntly, to a proposal for the United States to have to give up Florida."

== Analyses ==
Former NATO Deputy Secretary General Rose Gottemoeller emphasized that Trump's acknowledgment of security guarantees for Ukraine, and US participation in such, was of enormous importance. Harlan Ullman of the Atlantic Council feared that "security guarantees are going to be very, very difficult". Anatol Lieven, an analyst at the Quincy Institute for Responsible Statecraft, noted that Russia has from the start been in favor of a peace agreement without a prior ceasefire, as a ceasefire would give away its only leverage. Liza Fokht from the BBC also opined that a ceasefire would be disadvantageous for Russia. According to Al Jazeera, "With [Putin's] forces inching forward in Ukraine, he has little incentive to freeze their movement."

John Foreman, a former British military attaché in Moscow, laid out Putin's maximalist demands: "Russia might accept a US security guarantee for Ukraine in return for formal recognition of the occupied territories, effectively partitioning Ukraine for the long term, and no NATO (troops) in Ukraine and no Ukraine in NATO ... Whatever happens, the Coalition of the Willing is no substitute for US power." Former British Defence Secretary Ben Wallace stated that "The reality that everyone seems to want to avoid admitting or doing anything about is that Putin shows no sign of wanting to stop the killing".

Tatiana Stanovaya, a senior analyst at the Carnegie Russia Eurasia Center, said that security guarantees come in all shapes and sizes, "But let's be clear: there's not going to be a US or European commitment to go to war with Russia if it reinvades Ukraine.

In regard to possible land swaps discussed by Trump, Zelenskyy had pointed out over the weekend that the Constitution of Ukraine forbids such; a national referendum would be required to amend it.

More broadly, Gérard Araud, the French Ambassador to the United States during Trump's first term, equated both summits in terms of substance: "In Anchorage and in Washington, it was a triumph of empty vagueness and meaningless commitments ... In both cases, no firm decision has been taken. Nothing has changed." In the same vein the editorial board of The Wall Street Journal stated, four days after the summit, that "All the happy smiles of diplomacy won't make a difference unless Mr. Putin thinks that the cost to him of continuing the war is higher than the risk of ending it."

== Gallery ==
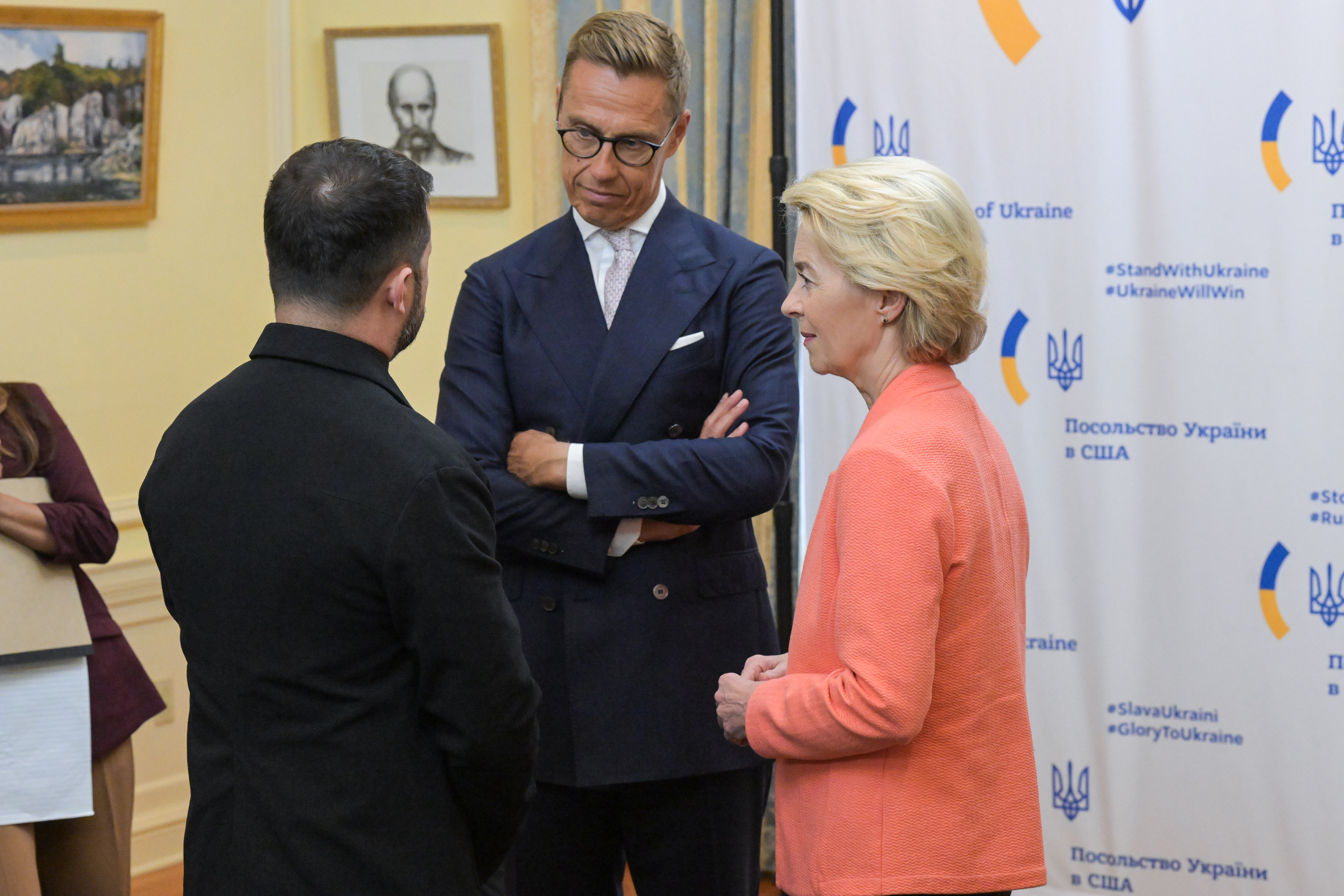
Zelenskyy, President of Finland Alexander Stubb, and von der Leyen confer beforehand at the Ukraine Embassy. Portrait: polymath and major historic figure Taras Shevchenko.

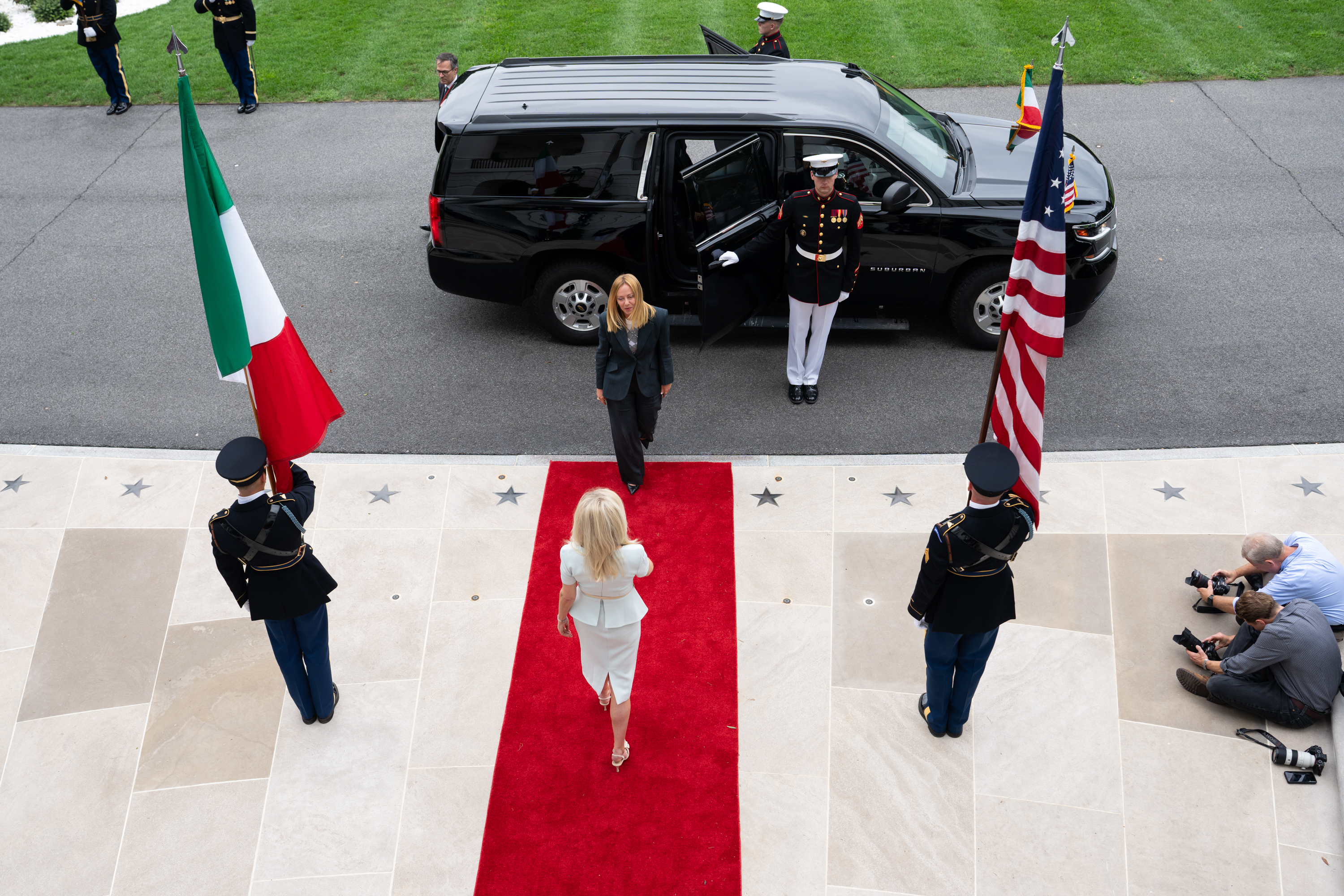
Prime Minister of Italy Giorgia Meloni is greeted by a USMC honor guard and Chief of Protocol of the United States Monica Crowley.

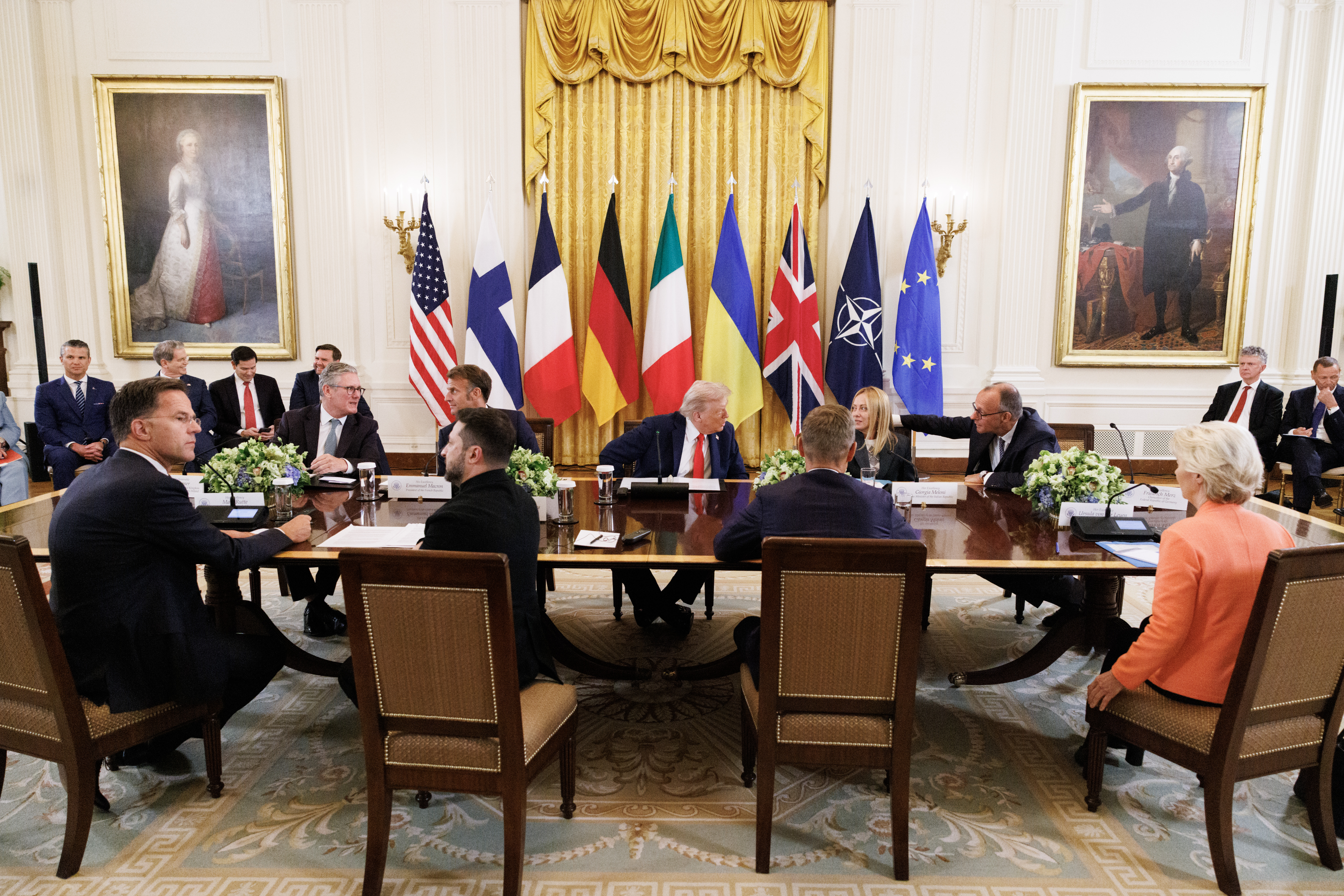
EU, NATO members, and Zelenskyy before their meeting formally convenes

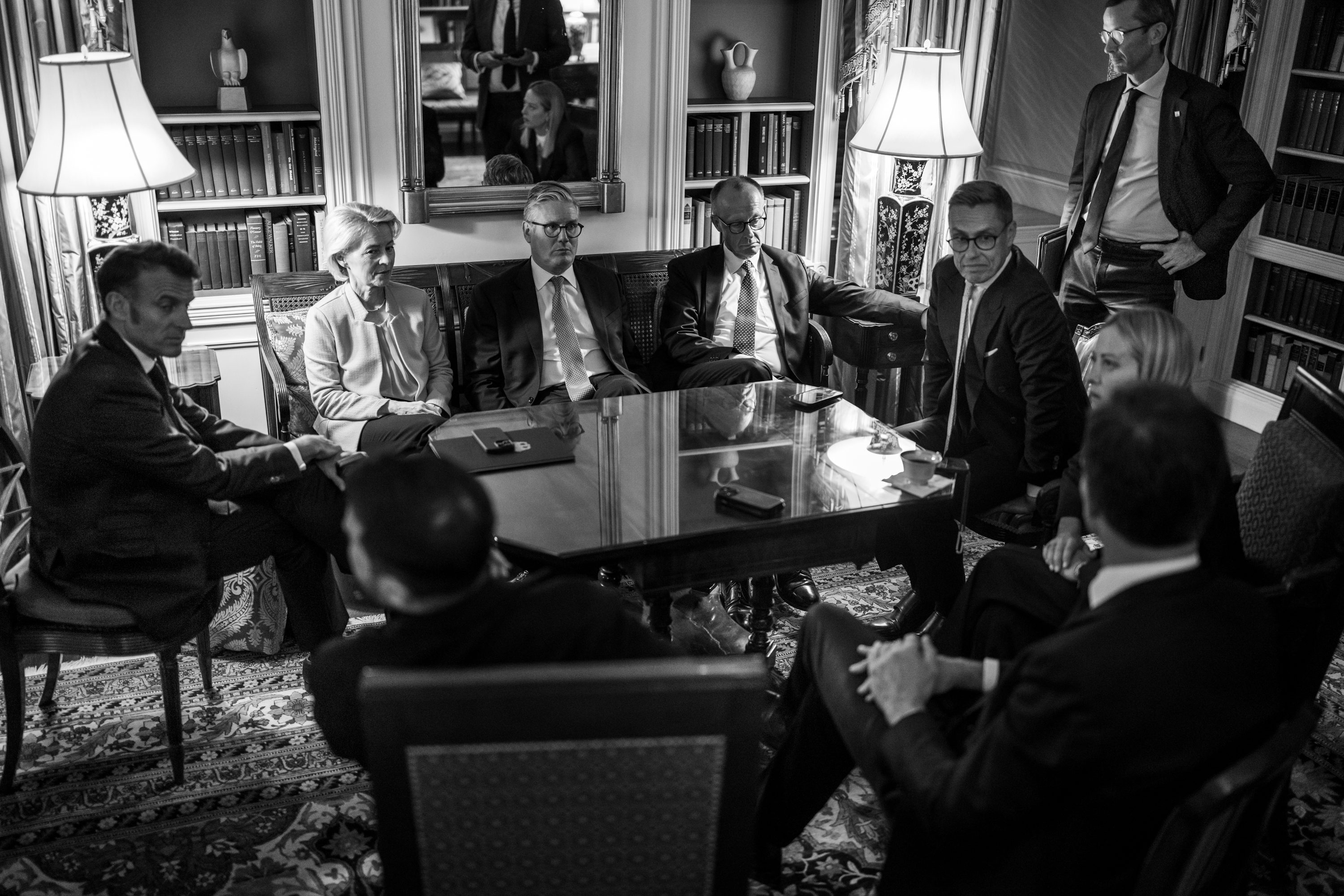
European Leaders wait in the Roosevelt Room as Trump calls Vladimir Putin.

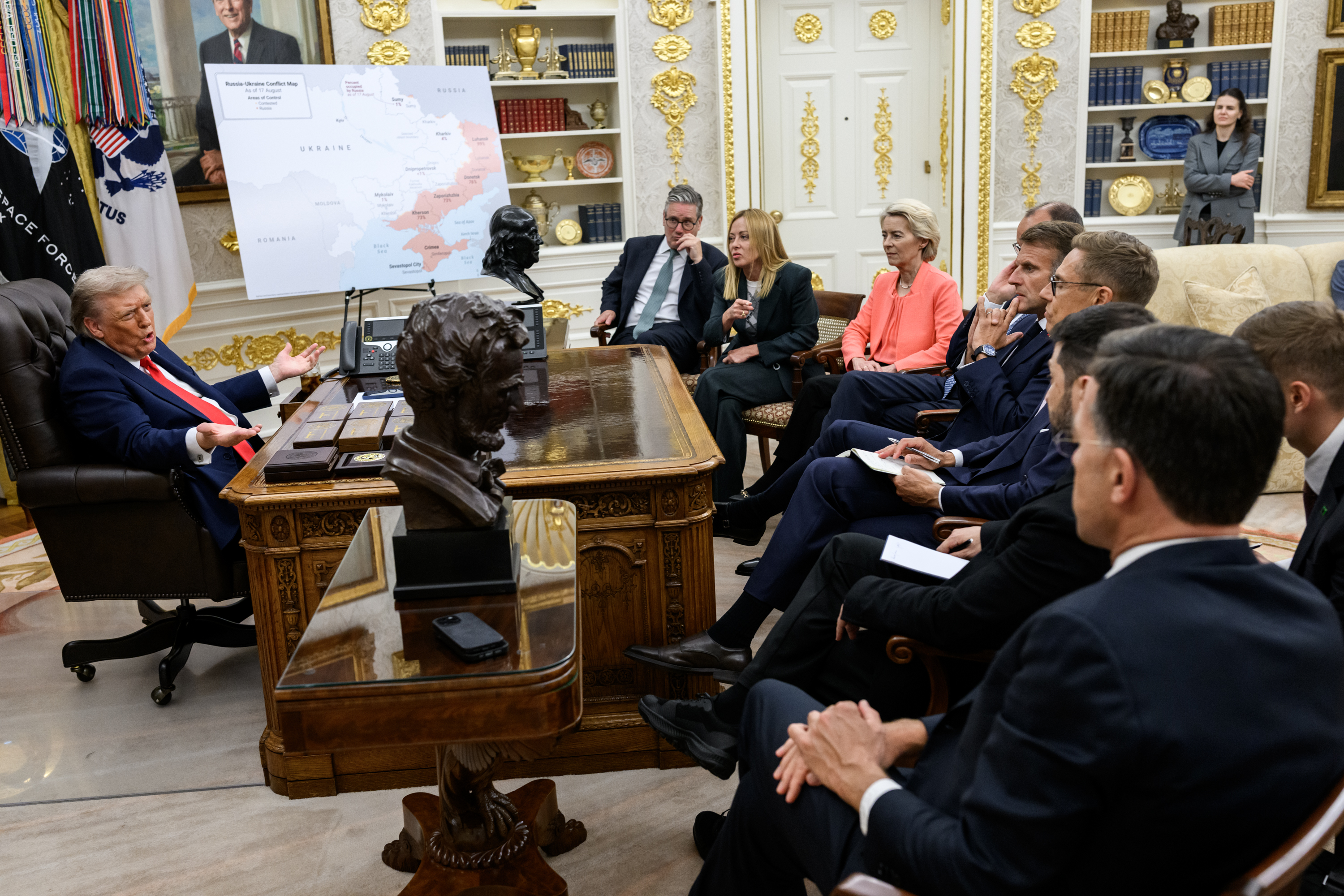
Trump briefs the other leaders in the Oval Office on his conversation with Putin. Note the map of territory held by Russia in Ukraine.

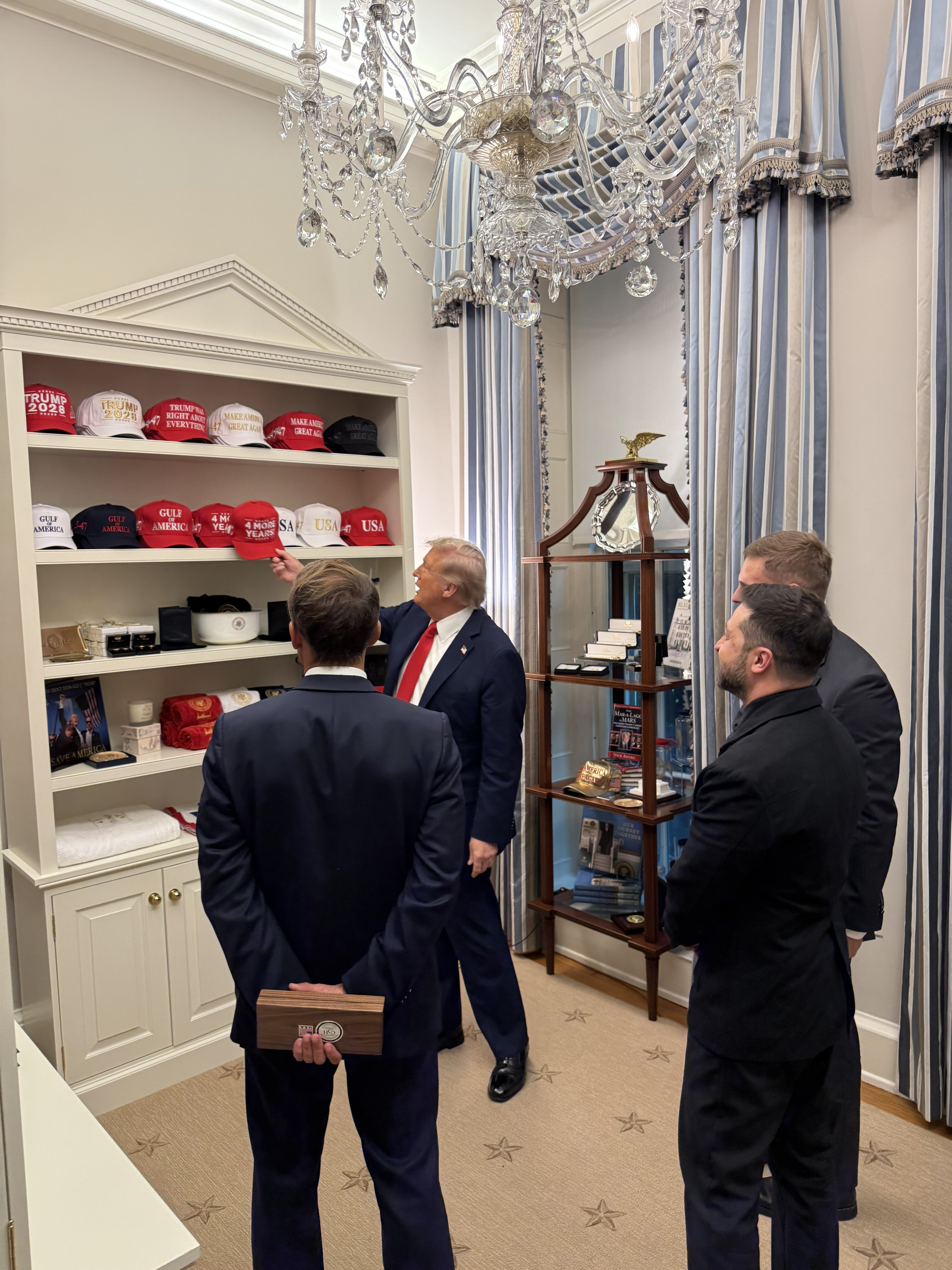
Trump shows Macron and Zelenskyy his MAGA memorabilia, pulling out a red cap inscribed "4 more years".

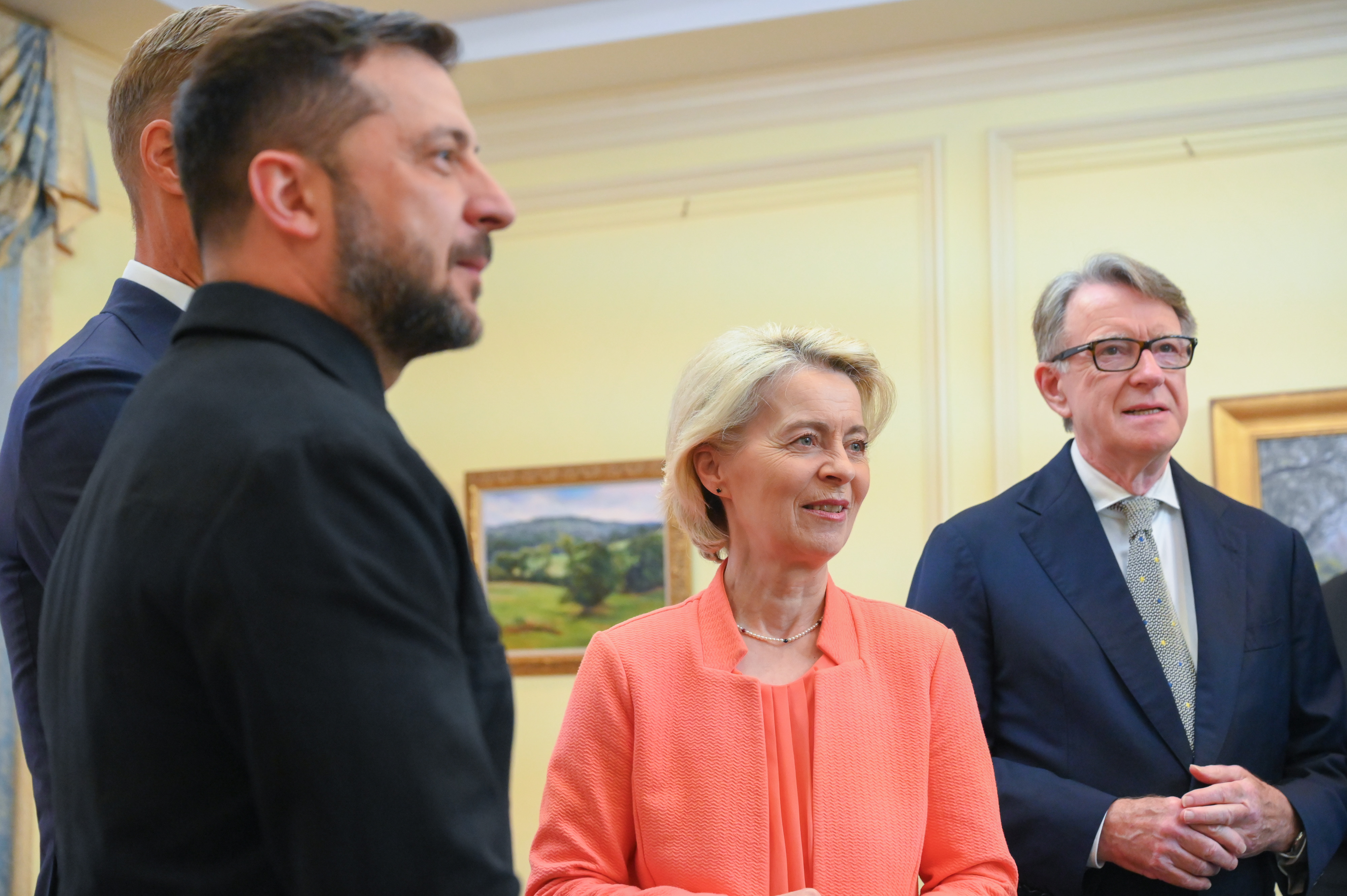
Stubb (behind Zelenskyy), von der Leyen, and British Ambassador Peter Mandelson

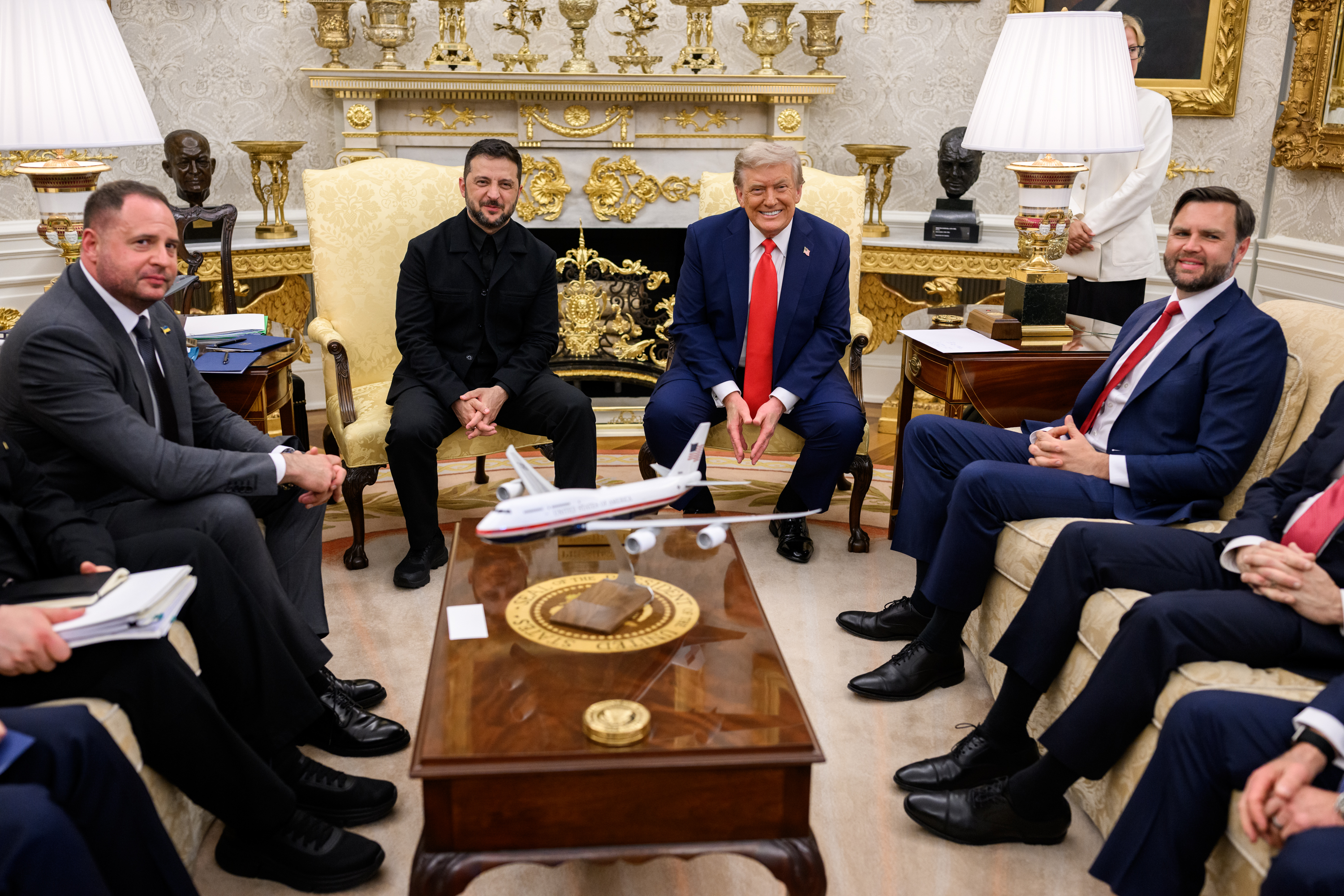
Andriy Yermak (Head of the Office of the President of Ukraine), Zelenskyy, Trump, and US Vice President JD Vance

== Next meetings ==
On 22 November 2025, after Volodymyr Zelenskyy, Ukraine's president, said US proposed peace plan draft presented his country with a choice between "losing dignity" or forfeiting American support amid the US reported threats to withhold weapons and suspend intelligence sharing if Zelenskyy does not agree to it, Sky News revealed European leaders discussions to visit White House for aligning Europe-US position on Ukraine. The next day, origin of the initial draft was questioned, and counter-proposal of Ukraine's European partners was revealed. On 28 December President Trump confirmed plan to meet with European leaders and Ukraine in January 2026.

== See also ==
- February 2025 United States–Russia Summit in Saudi Arabia – Meeting between the US and Russia on February 18, 2025
- 2025 Russia–United States summit – Meeting between Donald Trump and Vladimir Putin in Alaska over Ukraine in August 2025
- June 2024 Ukraine peace summit – International summit in Switzerland
- Multinational Force–Ukraine – Proposed force for peace enforcement
- Peace negotiations in the Russo-Ukrainian war (2022–present) § Developments under the second Trump presidency (since 2025)
- Foreign policy of the second Trump administration § Russia and Ukraine
- United States and the Russian invasion of Ukraine § Second Trump administration (2025–present)
