= February 2025 United States–Russia meeting in Saudi Arabia =

Meeting between the US and Russia on February 18, 2025

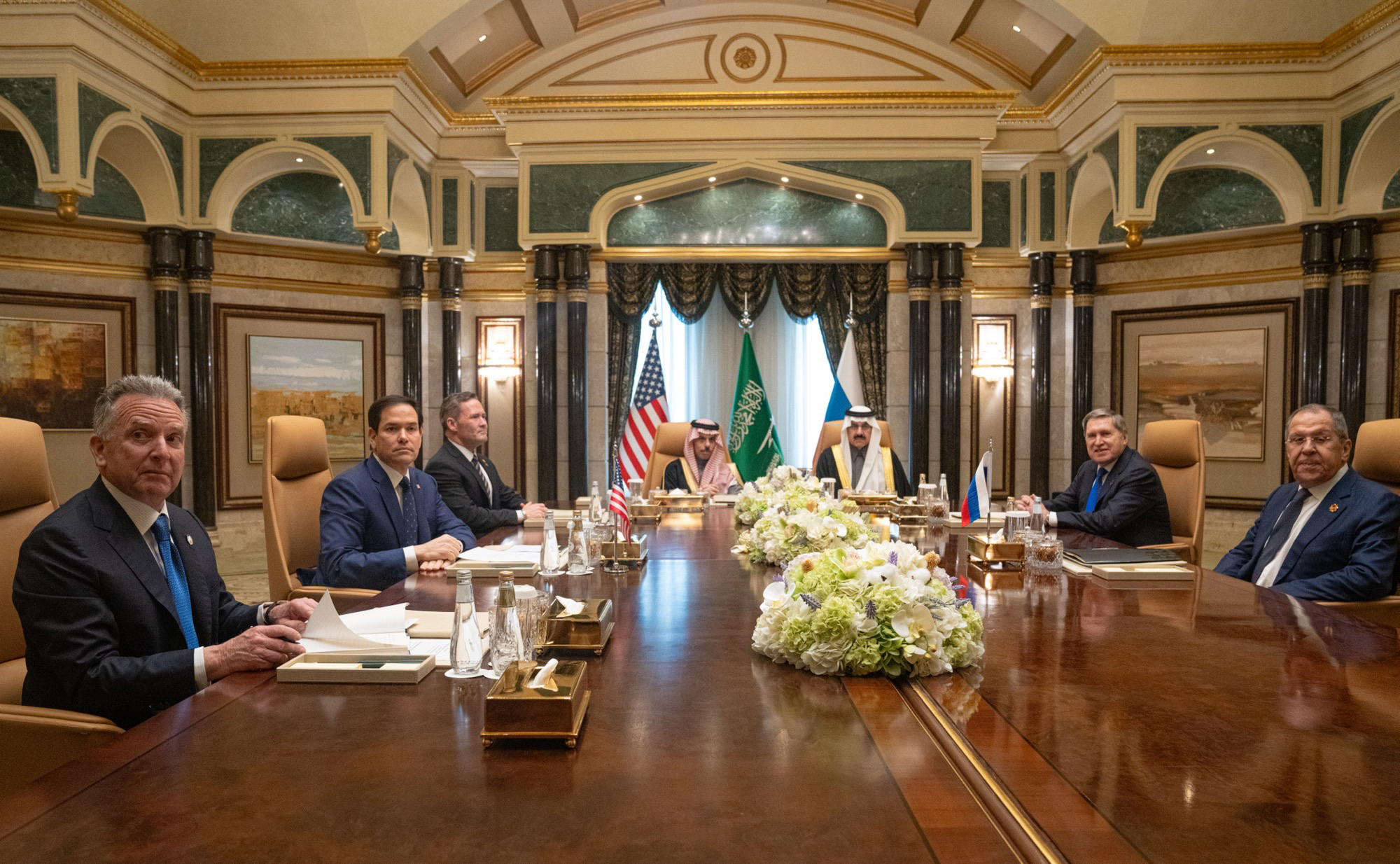
- US and Russian delegates at the meeting
- Host country: Saudi Arabia
- Date: 18 February 2025
- Cities: Riyadh
- Venues: Diriyah Palace
- Participants: (United States) Marco Rubio; (Russia) Sergey Lavrov
- Follows: 2021 Geneva summit
- Precedes: 2025 Alaska summit

Key points
- Russo-Ukrainian War, Economic cooperation

The February 2025 United States–Russia meeting in Saudi Arabia (also known as the 2025 Saudi Arabia meeting) was a meeting at the ministerial level between the United States and Russia. It was held on 18 February 2025, and involved three American delegates led by US secretary of state Marco Rubio and two Russian delegates led by foreign minister Sergey Lavrov at Diriyah Palace in Riyadh, Saudi Arabia to discuss improving Russia–United States relations and plans to end the war in Ukraine. Despite the meeting being primarily about Ukraine, no Ukrainian or European delegations were invited to the meeting. United States President Donald Trump has dismissed Ukrainian concerns that Ukraine was not invited to the meeting, and also apparently implied Ukraine was to blame for starting the war. The Riyadh meeting was the most extensive diplomatic meeting between the United States and Russia since Russia's February 2022 invasion of Ukraine.

== Background ==
The meeting came less than a week after Donald Trump's phone call with Russian President Vladimir Putin on 12 February 2025 on a wide range of topics in which Trump and Putin agreed to begin negotiations to end the war in Ukraine. The day before the meeting, several European leaders met in Paris to discuss the war in Ukraine. At the time of the meeting, Russia forces had been making slow gains in southeastern Ukraine, however Ukrainian troops still occupied parts of Russia around the town of Sudzha. Trump had previously promised to end the war in Ukraine in 24 hours, however he later rolled back on this promise, saying his administration's new goal is to end the war within 100 days of taking office. The meeting was also held only two days after the conclusion of the 2025 Munich Security Conference, in which United States Vice President JD Vance made several controversial remarks on Europe, criticising German mainstream political parties' firewall against far-right parties in Germany and downplaying the threat of Russia to Europe.

On 16 February 2025, Secretary of State Marco Rubio stated that Ukraine and Europe would be part of any future "real negotiations" to end the war. President Trump said on the same day that the Ukrainian President Zelenskyy "will be involved" in peace negotiations.

== United States–Russia talks ==
The call and summit represented a major shift in United States foreign policy towards Russia, as Trump criticised Ukrainian peace negotiation in the war, saying he was "very disappointed [in Ukraine]" and that Ukraine has "been there for three years. [Ukraine] should have ended it three years [ago] – you should have never started it. You could have made a deal". Trump later said that Russia did invade, but that the United States shouldn't have let Russia attack. The meeting was held in Diriyah Palace in Riyadh, Saudi Arabia. United States Secretary of State Marco Rubio and Russian Foreign Minister Sergey Lavrov led the American and Russian delegations, respectively. On the American side, Marco Rubio, Steve Witkoff, and Mike Waltz represented the United States at the meeting while Sergey Lavrov and Yuri Ushakov represented Russia. The day before, several European officials met in Paris to discuss the war in Ukraine and the recent American reversal in foreign policy, including proposing to send peacekeeping troops to Ukraine. However, Sergey Lavrov rejected any NATO peacekeeping force in Ukraine during the meeting, saying "the expansion of NATO, the absorption of Ukraine by the North Atlantic alliance, is a direct threat to the interests of the Russian Federation." Russia and the United States also agreed to restore staffing at each other's embassies.

The meeting laid the groundwork for a future meeting between Putin and Trump, with Kremlin spokesperson Dmitry Peskov saying the meeting could take place before the end of February, though this did not end up happening. Marco Rubio said a potential meeting between Trump and Putin would "largely depend on whether we can make progress on ending the war in Ukraine."

== Responses ==
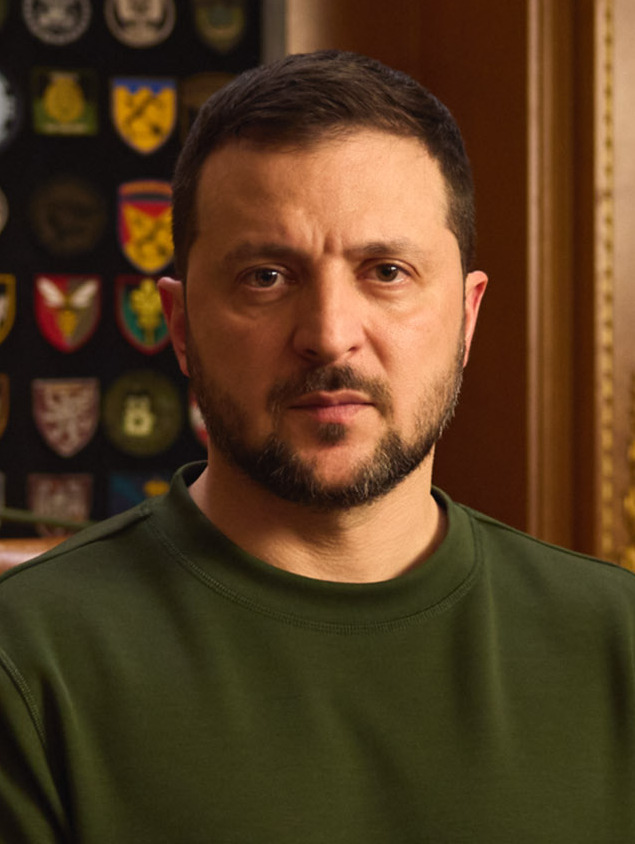
Ukrainian President Volodymyr Zelenskyy. No Ukrainians were invited to the Riyadh meeting.

- Ukraine: In response to Ukraine not being invited to the Riyadh meeting, President Volodymyr Zelenskyy cancelled a planned visit to Saudi Arabia. Zelenskyy has also said that he will not accept any deal imposed on Ukraine without Ukraine's input. The meeting contributed to the sharp deterioration of relations between Zelenskyy and Trump, after Trump called Zelenskyy a "dictator" and Zelenskyy said Trump was in a "disinformation bubble".
- United States: According to Secretary of State Marco Rubio, President Trump wanted to know if Russia is serious about ending the war, and stated "the only way is to test them, to basically engage them and say, 'Okay, are you serious about ending the war? And if so, what are your demands? Are your public demands and your private demands different?'"
- United Kingdom: On 19 February 2025, Prime Minister Keir Starmer phoned Zelenskyy, saying that "it was perfectly reasonable to suspend elections during war time as the UK did during World War II". Starmer also "reiterated his support for the US-led efforts to get a lasting peace in Ukraine that deterred Russia from any future aggression". Starmer later said after a second call with Zelenskyy on 22 Feb that he would back Ukraine in peace talks with Donald Trump, and that safeguarding Ukrainian sovereignty was "essential to deter future aggression from Russia".
- Poland: Minister of Foreign Affairs Radosław Sikorski said after the meeting that Poland would maximise support for Ukraine and step up EU sanctions against Russia and Belarus.
- Finland: Minister for Foreign Affairs Elina Valtonen said on 21 February 2025 that, "Peace in Ukraine must be just and lasting. Europe must take a leading role in supporting Ukraine. We must continue our support so that Ukraine will be able to negotiate from as powerful a position as possible. There can be no negotiations about Ukraine without Ukraine and no negotiations about Europe without Europe".
- Estonia: Head of the Estonian delegation to the OSCE Winter Meeting Mati Raidma said that "Global power relations are changing before our very eyes" and that Estonia must show full solidarity with Ukraine "in every possible way".
- Germany: Foreign Minister Annalena Baerbock said in response to the Riyadh meeting that "A sham peace, which would merely grant Russia a reprieve to prepare for new military offensives, would serve no one: not Ukraine, not Europe, and not the United States" and that Germany "will also need to further increase our bilateral support for Ukraine and take the necessary budgetary decisions whether we like it or not".
- Latvia: Speaker of the Saeima Daiga Mieriņa said during a meeting with Lithuanian Prime Minister Gintautas Paluckas that Ukraine must take part in the peace negotiations and that "Europe’s security is inseparable from Ukraine’s security. The stronger, more united, and more resilient we are, the better we can provide for our own security". The meeting also addressed the Baltic states' recent disconnection from the BRELL energy grid.

== Further meetings ==
On 2 March 2025, Starmer hosted a summit in London with several international leaders to create a "coalition of the willing" to support Ukraine in negotiations and to put Ukraine in a stronger position for negotiations. The London summit also hoped to craft a peace deal for Ukraine and to present it to the United States, with Starmer stating that the US was "not an unreliable ally" despite recent hostilities between the US government and Ukraine.

On 11 March, representatives of the US and Ukraine met in Jeddah to discuss peace negotiations, with the US restoring aid and intelligence sharing it had previously cut off to Ukraine.

On 23 and 24 March, representatives of the US met with representatives of Ukraine and Russia separately to negotiate peace in Ukraine through shuttle diplomacy. The talks with Ukraine on the 23rd failed to secure a 30-day ceasefire as Trump had been hoping, however, Putin did agree to stop Russian attacks on Ukrainian energy infrastructure. The talks with Russia on the 24th attempted to resume a 2022 grain deal intended to allow Ukraine to continue exporting grain that had been previously pulled out of by Russia in 2023, with both sides agreeing separately to stop the use of force in the Black Sea after certain measures were met. Neither talk mentioned territorial gains or losses after the resolution of the war. Due to the vastly differing visions for peace between Ukraine and Russia, not much was achieved at the summits, although Witkoff did say he expected "some real progress".

On 7 April, leaders of several European nations met in Brussels, stating that although Putin has claimed that Russia wants peace, he has not shown any inclination to negotiate. German Defence Minister Boris Pistorius stated that "peace in Ukraine appears to be out of reach in the immediate future" due to Russia's ongoing aggression. US General Keith Kellogg had said that Ukraine could be partitioned in a peace deal and that in order to end the war, Ukraine would have to concede to Russian territorial demands, leading to significant tension during the meeting. US Defense Secretary Pete Hegseth was notably not present at the meeting, choosing instead to attend virtually.

Also on 7 April, Witkoff met with Putin in St. Petersburg, with the talks having been described as "productive" by Russian CEO and special envoy Kirill Dmitriev. The meeting focused on peace in Ukraine, with Peskov saying that the "process of normalising relations is ongoing".

== See also ==
- 2025 Trump–Zelenskyy Oval Office meeting – Meeting between the presidents of Ukraine and the U.S. on February 28, 2025
- 2025 Russia–United States summit in Alaska – Meeting between Donald Trump and Vladimir Putin in Alaska over Ukraine in August 2025
- August 2025 White House multilateral meeting on Ukraine – Meeting between European leaders and the U.S. president over Ukraine on August 18, 2025
- 2025 Budapest summit – Proposed meeting between Donald Trump and Vladimir Putin in Hungary
- Détente – Relaxation of strained international relations by verbal communication
- Peace negotiations in the Russo-Ukrainian war
- Foreign policy of the second Trump administration § Russia and Ukraine
- United States and the Russian invasion of Ukraine
- List of Russia–United States summits
