= 2025 Russia–United States summit in Hungary =

Proposed meeting between Donald Trump and Vladimir Putin in Hungary

2025 Russia–United States summit in Budapest
- Host country: Hungary
- Date: Cancelled
- Cities: Budapest
- Participants: None
- Follows: 2025 Alaska summit

Key points
- Russo-Ukrainian War, Economic cooperation, Territory

The 2025 Budapest summit (also known as the 2025 Russia–United States summit in Budapest or the Trump–Putin summit in Budapest) was a proposed summit between United States president Donald Trump and Russian president Vladimir Putin to take place in Budapest, Hungary. Trump had announced on October 16, 2025, that it would be held within two weeks, with the ongoing Russo-Ukrainian war as the main topic of discussion. He announced on October 22 that he had cancelled the meeting over Russia's refusal to back down from its maximalist claims on Ukraine.

On November 7, while he was hosting the Hungarian prime-minister Viktor Orban in the White House, Trump said that a summit in Budapest could still take place. Later, Orban said the summit was still on the agenda, that the meeting had been postponed, but not cancelled. On November 11, Russian Foreign Minister Sergey Lavrov said that Russia was ready to discuss with the United States preparations for the summit "if and when the American colleagues return to their proposal."

== Background ==
During Trump's 2024 presidential campaign, he promised to end the Russo-Ukrainian war (2022–present) on his first day in office. In March he said that he was being sarcastic when he made the promise. A meeting between Putin and Trump billed as the 2025 Alaska Summit ended without an agreement.

== History ==
On October 16, 2025, Trump, after a phone call from Putin that lasted more than two hours, announced that another summit would take place in Budapest, Hungary, within "two weeks or so". On October 17, Trump indicated interest in meeting President Volodymyr Zelenskyy of Ukraine in a separate meeting at the summit so that Zelenskyy and Putin would not meet. On October 18, two senior officials familiar with the October 16 phone call said that Putin told Trump he would be willing to exchange Zaporizhzhia and Kherson for Donetsk.

On October 20, the Russian Foreign Ministry said that US Secretary of State Marco Rubio and Russian Foreign Minister Sergey Lavrov held a "constructive" call that day preparing for the summit. However, on October 22, Trump told reporters that the meeting had been cancelled because negotiations had stalled. Trump proposed a ceasefire supported by Ukraine and European leaders to freeze the conflict on the current front line, while Russia pressed for its maximalist claims on Ukraine, including the refusal to freeze the fight along the current front line, demanding the recognition of full Russian sovereignty over the Donbas and the demilitarisation of Ukraine.

On November 7, while he was hosting the Hungarian prime-minister Viktor Orban in the White House, Trump said that a summit in Budapest could still take place. Later, Orban said in an interview that a large-scale peace summit in Budapest was still on the agenda, and that the meeting had been postponed, but not cancelled.

On November 11, Russian Foreign Minister Sergey Lavrov said that Russia was ready to discuss with the United States preparations for the summit "if and when the American colleagues return to their proposal." He also said that Budapest would be a preferable location for the meeting between Trump and Putin.

=== Putin's travel options ===
Following Russia's 2022 invasion of Ukraine, the European Union imposed a ban on Russian-registered aircraft, including non-scheduled flights such as Putin's Ilyushin Il-96 aircraft, prohibiting them from entering its airspace. Poland announced that if his plane entered their airspace it could be forced to land and they would execute the International Criminal Court's warrant for his arrest. Latvia also said that it would not permit him to fly over its territory. Bulgaria announced that it would give him permission.

=== International response ===
Olof Gill, spokesman for the European Commission, welcomed the summit indicating that it would bring about "lasting peace for Ukraine." Far-right groups in the European Parliament welcomed the summit. Lithuanian foreign minister Kęstutis Budrys said that the only place for Putin in Europe is the International Court in The Hague, before a tribunal, not in any European capital. German foreign minister Johann Wadephul stated that they were in support of Ukraine's presence at the summit. French president Emmanuel Macron and Finnish foreign minister Elina Valtonen expressed interest in joining Ukraine at the summit.

== See also ==
- February 2025 United States–Russia Summit in Saudi Arabia – Meeting between the US and Russia on February 18, 2025
- 2025 Trump–Zelenskyy Oval Office meeting – Meeting between the presidents of Ukraine and the U.S. on February 28, 2025
- 2025 Russia–United States Summit in Alaska – Meeting between Donald Trump and Vladimir Putin in Alaska over Ukraine in August 2025
- August 2025 White House multilateral meeting on Ukraine – Meeting between European leaders and the U.S. president over Ukraine on August 18, 2025
- 1960 US-Soviet summit, a similar summit canceled because of a U-2 spy plane incident
- Détente – Relaxation of strained international relations by verbal communication
- Hungary and the Russian invasion of Ukraine
- Peace negotiations in the Russo-Ukrainian war
- Foreign policy of the second Trump administration § Russia and Ukraine
- United States and the Russian invasion of Ukraine
- List of Russia–United States summits
