= 2025 Russia–United States summit =

Meeting between Donald Trump and Vladimir Putin in Alaska over Ukraine in August 2025

2025 Russia–United States Summit
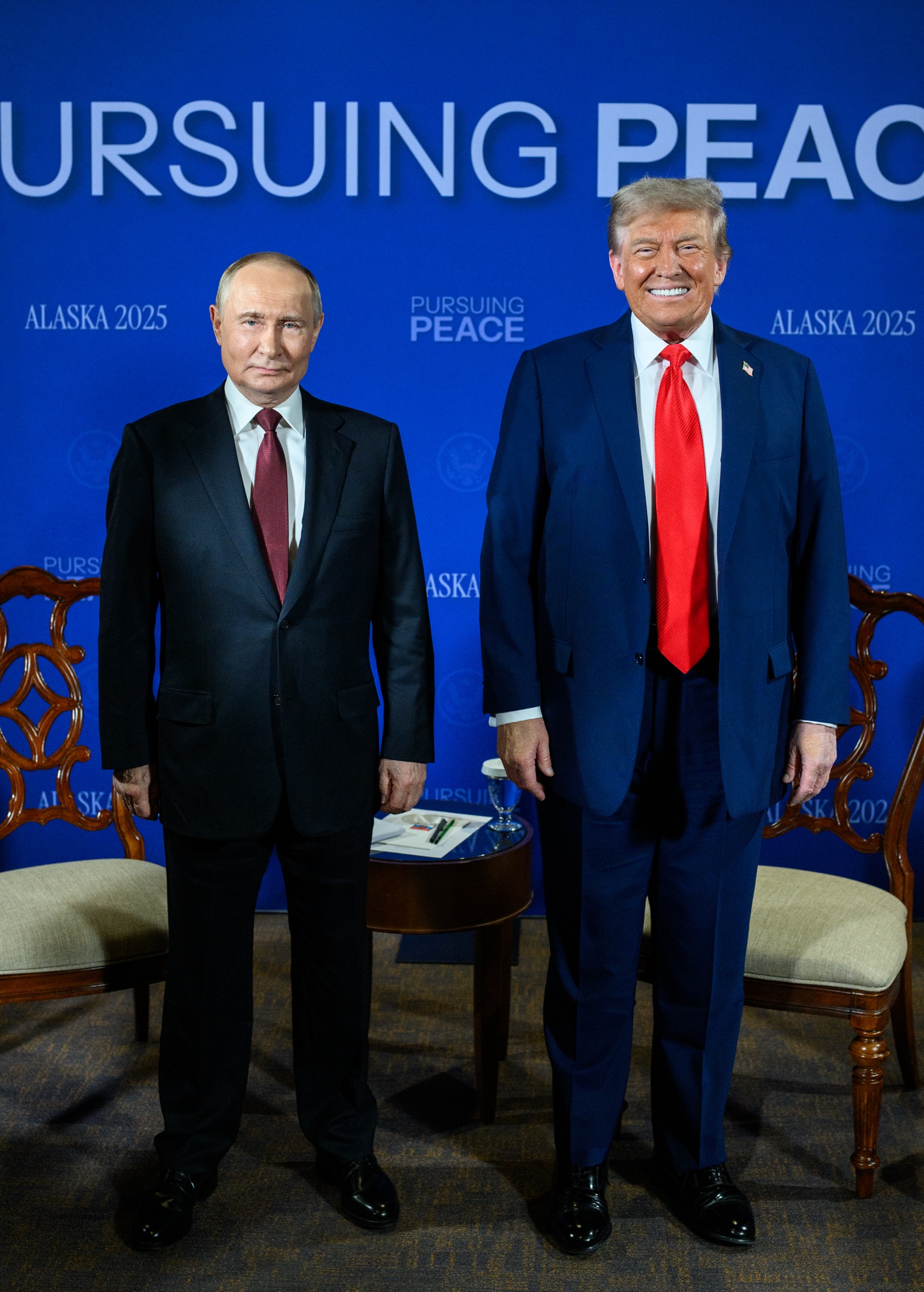
- Vladimir Putin and Donald Trump during the summit
- Host country: United States
- Date: August 15, 2025
- Cities: Anchorage, Alaska
- Venues: Joint Base Elmendorf–Richardson
- Participants: (United States) Donald Trump; (United States) Marco Rubio; (United States) Steve Witkoff; (Russia) Vladimir Putin; (Russia) Sergey Lavrov; (Russia) Yuri Ushakov
- Follows: 2021 Summit

Key points
- Russo-Ukrainian War, Economic cooperation, Territory

The 2025 Russia–United States Summit (also known as the Trump–Putin Summit in Alaska) was a summit meeting between United States president Donald Trump and Russian president Vladimir Putin. It was held on August 15, 2025, at Joint Base Elmendorf–Richardson in Anchorage, Alaska. The main topic of discussion was the ongoing Russo-Ukrainian war. The summit ended without an agreement being announced, although Trump later intimated that in his view the onus was now on Ukraine to cede territory in order to end the war.

It was the first time Putin was invited to a Western country since he ordered the full-scale Russian invasion of Ukraine in 2022. Putin faces an arrest warrant issued by the International Criminal Court (of which the U.S. is not a member) for alleged war crimes. It was also the first time that a Russian presidential visit to the United States has been held on a U.S. military property. It was the first meeting between Trump and Putin since Trump was reelected in 2024, the first between them as sitting presidents since their last meeting in 2019 in Osaka, their first summit since the 2018 Helsinki Summit, and the first meeting between presidents of both countries since the Russian invasion of Ukraine, which occurred eight months after the 2021 Geneva Summit between Joe Biden and Putin. It was Putin's first visit to the United States since 2015 when he attended the 70th session of the United Nations General Assembly in New York City. It was also the first US-hosted meeting between the presidents of Russia and the United States since 2007, when Putin met with George W. Bush in Maine.

== Background ==
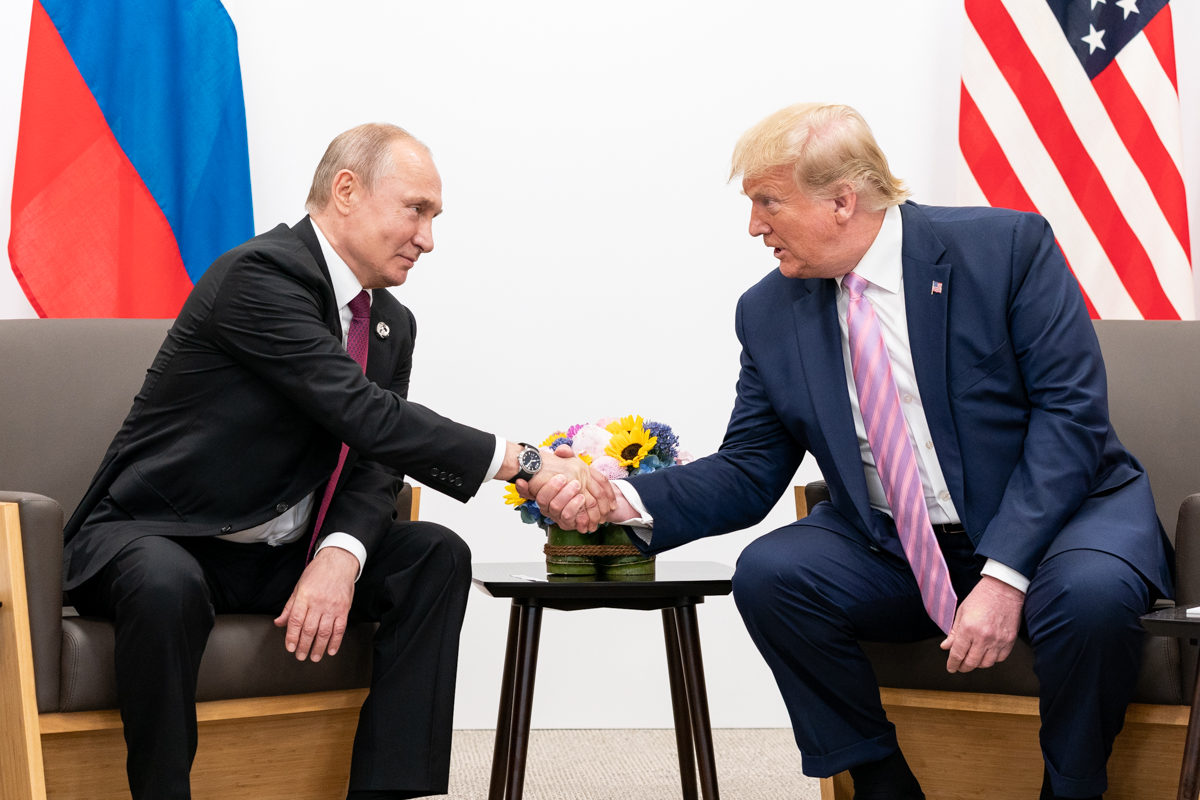
Russian president Vladimir Putin and US president Donald Trump at the G20 summit in Osaka, Japan, June 2019

In February 2022, Putin ordered the full-scale Russian invasion of Ukraine, starting the deadliest war in Europe since World War II. During the 2024 presidential election, then-presidential candidate Donald Trump campaigned with a promise to end the war on his first day in office. Trump became president in January 2025. On February 12, 2025, he held a surprise phone call with Putin which led to negotiations between Russia and the U.S. for the first time since the invasion.

Later that month, U.S. Secretary of State Marco Rubio met with Russian Foreign Minister Sergey Lavrov in Saudi Arabia to discuss improving Russia–United States relations and plans to end the war in Ukraine. The meeting laid the groundwork for a future meeting between Putin and Trump, with Kremlin spokesperson Dmitry Peskov saying the meeting could take place before the end of February, though this did not end up happening. Over the following months, Trump continued to communicate with Putin through phone calls and Truth Social posts.

Trump repeatedly threatened to impose further sanctions on Russia if it did not stop attacking Ukraine. Putin repeatedly ignored the warnings, and Trump did not follow through on them.

On May 8, Trump warned that the U.S. would impose further sanctions on Russia if it did not agree to a 30-day unconditional ceasefire. Russia rejected the ceasefire and continued to attack Ukraine.

Presidents Putin of Russia and Volodymyr Zelenskyy of Ukraine were due to hold direct negotiations in Istanbul on May 15, and Trump suggested he would also be there. However, Putin did not attend. Trump excused Putin's absence, saying he believes the only reason Putin did not attend was because he was not there, and said peace talks are only possible if he and Putin meet.

On May 28, Trump said he would know within two weeks whether Putin was serious about ending the war or was just "tapping us along". In May, June and July, Russian missile and drone attacks on Ukraine increased dramatically. Trump told reporters on July 23: "I go home, I tell the first lady: 'You know, I spoke to Vladimir today. We had a wonderful conversation.' And she said: 'Oh really? Another [Ukrainian] city was just hit.'" After Trump warned of sanctions and criticized Putin on Truth Social, the Kremlin described his posts as "emotional".

On July 14, Trump announced that the U.S. would impose more sanctions on Russia and 100% tariffs on countries that buy Russian oil if Putin did not agree to end the war within 50 days. On July 28, Trump announced that the deadline would be shortened to 10 or 12 days, citing a lack of progress. U.S. special envoy Steve Witkoff met with Putin in Moscow on August 6, two days before the deadline. Following the meeting, Trump said there was a "good chance" that a meeting with Putin would take place "very soon." When Trump's deadline arrived on August 8, instead of imposing sanctions, Trump announced that he would host Putin in Alaska on August 15.

Shortly before the Alaska meeting, Trump warned that there would be "severe consequences" for Russia if Putin did not agree to a ceasefire.

=== Military situation in Ukraine ===
Since September 2022, Russia has claimed four oblasts of Ukraine, as well as Crimea since 2014. Prior to the summit, it controlled 88% of the Donbas region (75% of Donetsk and 100% of Luhansk), and 74% of the region comprising the Zaporizhzhia and Kherson Oblasts, as well as small pockets of other regions. Prior to the summit, Russia made small gains in its Pokrovsk offensive in the Donbas region.

=== Nuclear tensions ===
On July 31, 2025, former Russian president and deputy chairman of the Security Council of Russia Dmitry Medvedev made a Telegram post warning President Trump of a "Dead Hand" threat, referencing the Soviet automatic nuclear launch mechanism. On August 1, President Trump announced the movement of two "Nuclear Submarines" toward Russia in response to the threat.

On August 4, 2025, Russia announced it "no longer considers itself bound" by the 1987 Intermediate-Range Nuclear Forces Treaty, which the US withdrew from in 2019. The following day, a Boeing WC-135R Constant Phoenix "nuke sniffer" aircraft flew near the Kola Peninsula. Analysts said the flight could indicate an upcoming test of the 9M730 Burevestnik nuclear-powered nuclear-capable cruise missile, previously tested in Arkhangelsk Oblast.

== Pre-meeting ==
President Trump had said on August 7, 2025, that it was not necessary for Putin to meet with Volodymyr Zelenskyy, president of Ukraine. He also said that both sides would have to make concessions. A Kremlin source stated that Russia could halt the war if it received territorial concessions in eastern Ukraine.

On August 8, President Trump announced on Truth Social that he was planning to meet with Putin in Alaska. Kremlin aide Yuri Ushakov later confirmed the talks, musing that Alaska was "quite logical" for a venue. Alaska may have been chosen for its location between both capitals, lack of US participation in the Rome Statute to carry out the International Criminal Court arrest warrant for Putin, as well as for its historical significance, including former Russian colonization, modern Russian Orthodox communities, and Cold War military usage.

On August 14, Ushakov announced that on the Russian side, the delegation will include himself, Foreign Minister Sergey Lavrov, Defence Minister Andrey Belousov, Finance Minister Anton Siluanov, and Special Presidential Envoy on Foreign Investment and Economic Cooperation Kirill Dmitriev.

Ahead of the summit Putin suggested negotiations could cover nuclear weapons treaties, such as the renewal of New START which expires in February 2026.

Several hundred people held a pro-Ukraine rally. Russian foreign minister Lavrov notably arrived at his hotel wearing a white СССР (USSR) sweatshirt underneath his cold weather vest; the move was described by The Guardian as a "not-so-subtle act of trolling".

== Trump–Putin meeting ==
=== Arrival ===
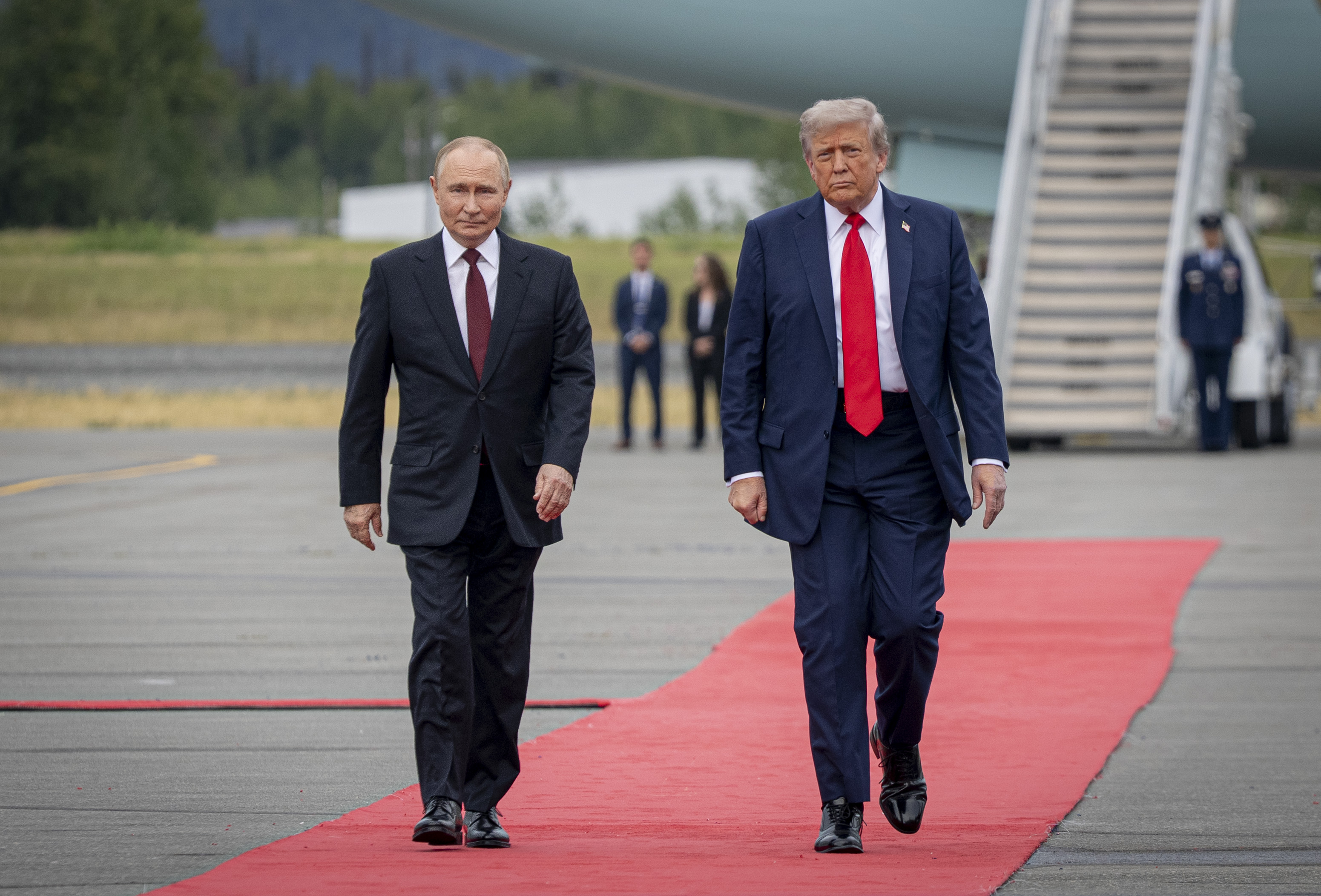
Putin's arrival in Alaska

Joint Base Elmendorf–Richardson in Anchorage, Alaska, was the location of the summit that was held on August 15, 2025. An L-shaped red carpet was laid out for the leaders to walk down to a platform that was labeled "ALASKA 2025" with four F-22 Raptor fighter jets lined up alongside it. President Trump touched down at Joint Base Elmendorf at 10:22 a.m. AKDT (UTC−08:00) Press Secretary Karoline Leavitt announced upon landing that the meeting would no longer be one-on-one between Trump-Putin but that it would be three-on-three with Secretary of State Marco Rubio and Special Envoy Steve Witkoff joining President Trump and Foreign Policy Aide Yury Ushakov and Foreign Minister Sergey Lavrov joining President Putin.

President Putin landed at the Air Base at 10:55 a.m. local time. Both men exited their planes at approximately 11:08 a.m., shook hands on the red carpet and posed on the ALASKA 2025 platform for a picture before shaking hands again and entering the presidential state car for transport to the meeting location. As the two stood on the platform, United States Air Force F-22 fighters or F-35 fighters and a B-2 bombers flew overhead. Russia 24 reported that President Trump invited Putin to join him in the car, with Putin eschewing his planned Aurus limo.

=== Meeting ===
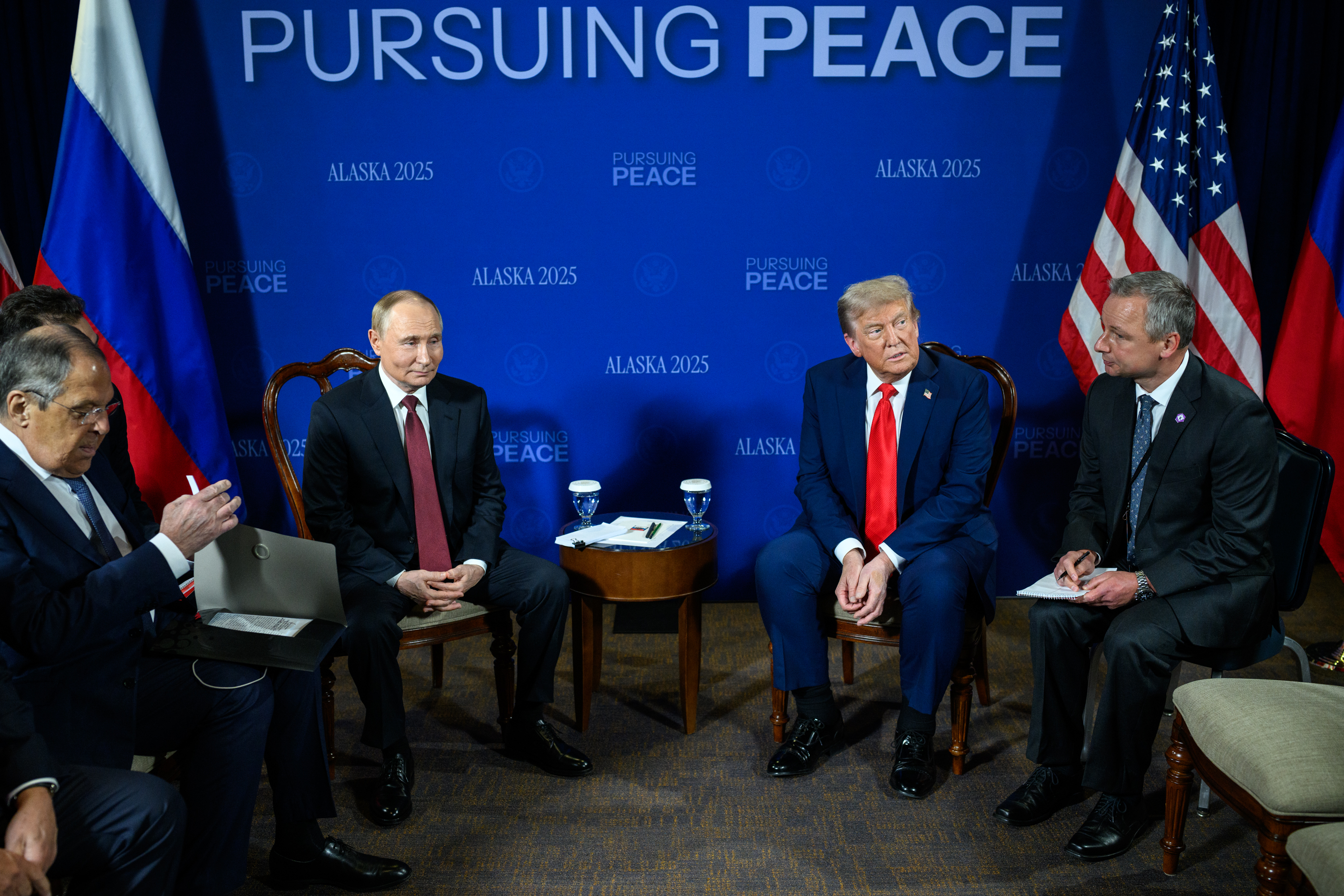
Trump's meeting with Putin

The meeting began at approximately 11:32 a.m. and concluded at approximately 2:18 p.m. A press briefing by the two leaders began at approximately 2:58.

During the meeting Putin went on a history lecture about Ukraine and Russia being "one nation," which caused Trump to raise his voice and threaten to walk out. Trump later proposed lifting sanctions against Russia for a ceasefire, but this was rejected by Putin, who insisted on Ukraine ceding territory in the Donbas region. Trump cancelled the working lunch, during which the delegations were supposed to discuss economic cooperation. The Financial Times reported that Putin lectured Trump on medieval and early modern Eastern European history, talking about the Viking chieftain Rurik, Grand Prince Yaroslav the Wise and Cossack leader Bohdan Khmelnytsky.

Trump gave a ceremonial gift to Putin of an "American Bald Eagle Desk Statue".

=== Press briefing ===
Putin began the presser by acknowledging that Russia–United States relations have suffered in recent years and that a meeting between the two nations was long overdue. Putin noted that negotiations were held in a "respectful, constructive and mutually respectful atmosphere". Trump began his remarks immediately afterwards saying he had "always had a fantastic relationship with President (Vladimir) Putin" but that it had been impeded by the "Russia hoax". Putin also noted his agreement with Trump that the security of Ukraine must be ensured. No substantial change in the status quo was announced, however, and neither Trump nor Putin took any questions from the world press. Trump was notably vague and subdued after the summit, not specifically mentioning Ukraine or a ceasefire even once (the putative reasons for the summit), and in marked contrast with Putin did not speak at length.

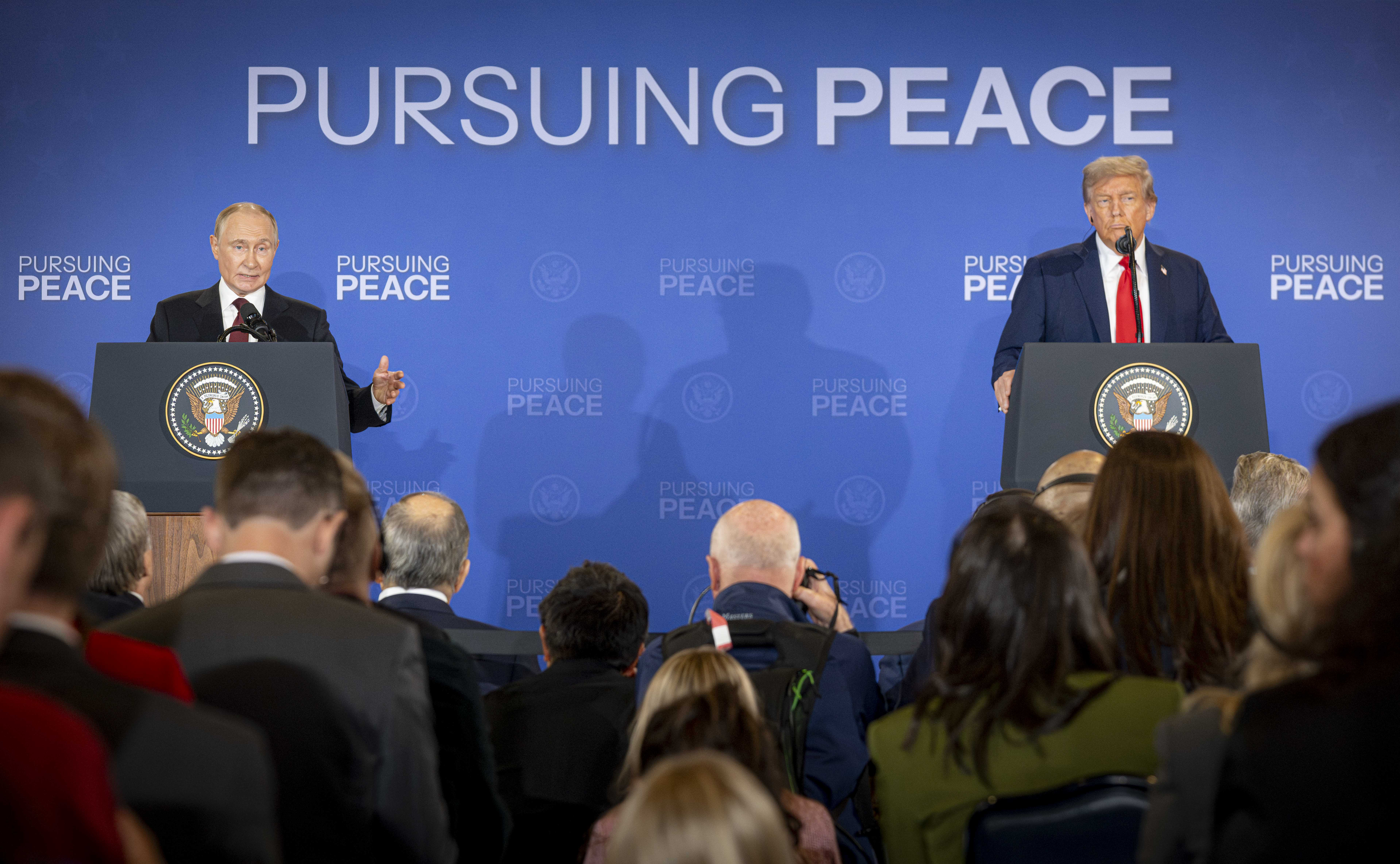
Putin and Trump addressing the media

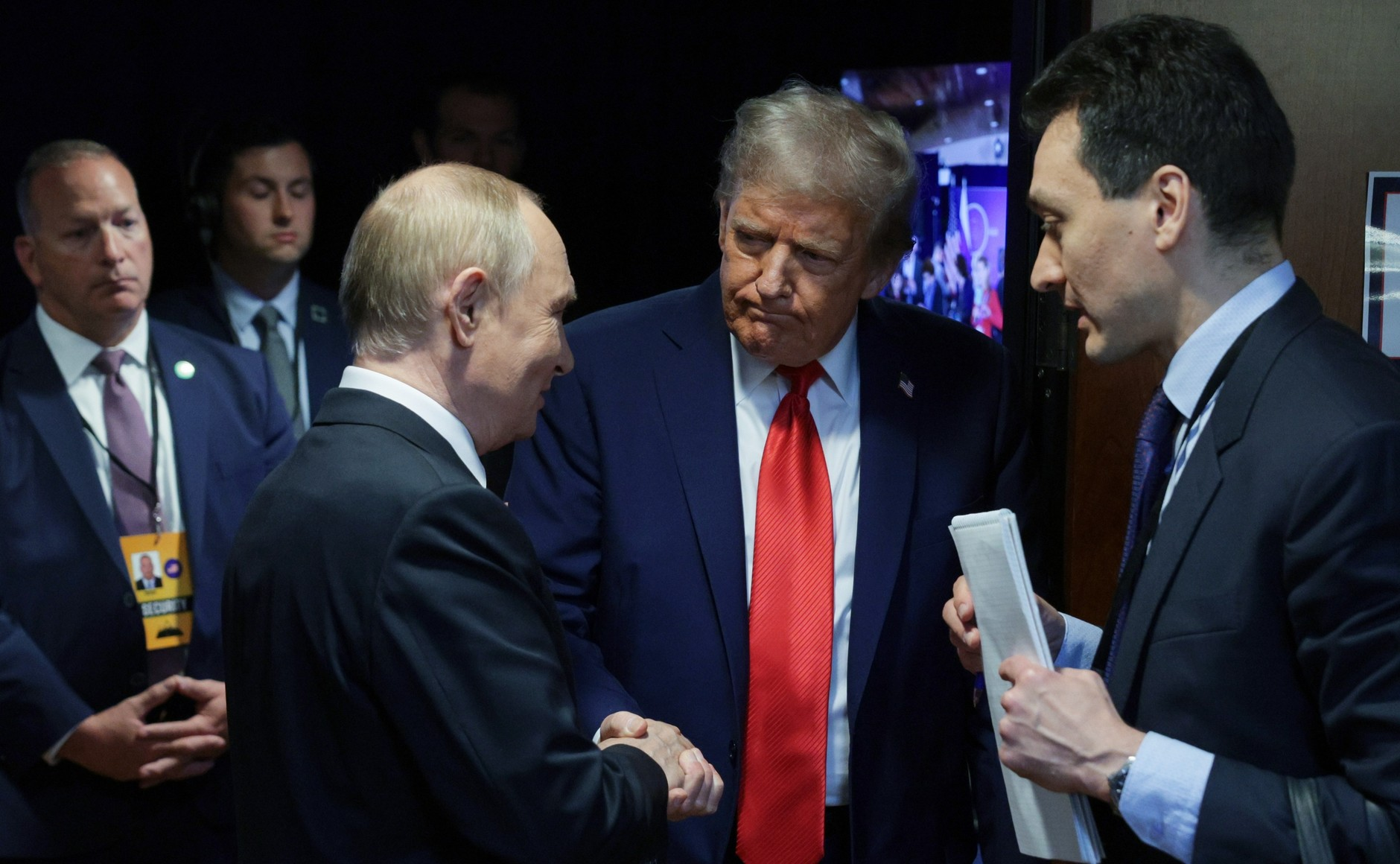
Putin and Trump after the press briefing

== Aftermath ==
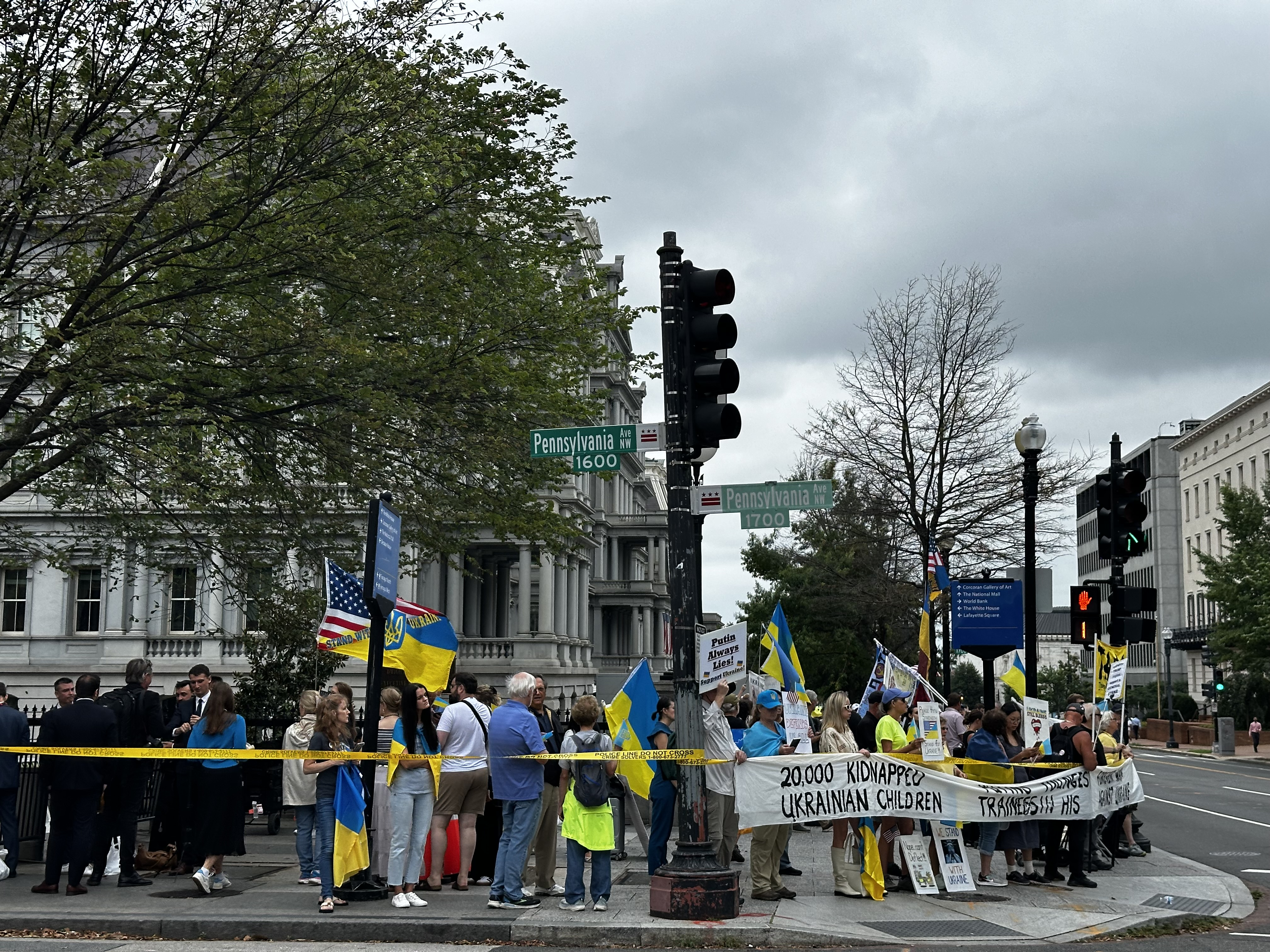
Pro-Ukrainian demonstrators at the White House prior to the summit between Trump and Zelenskyy later that day

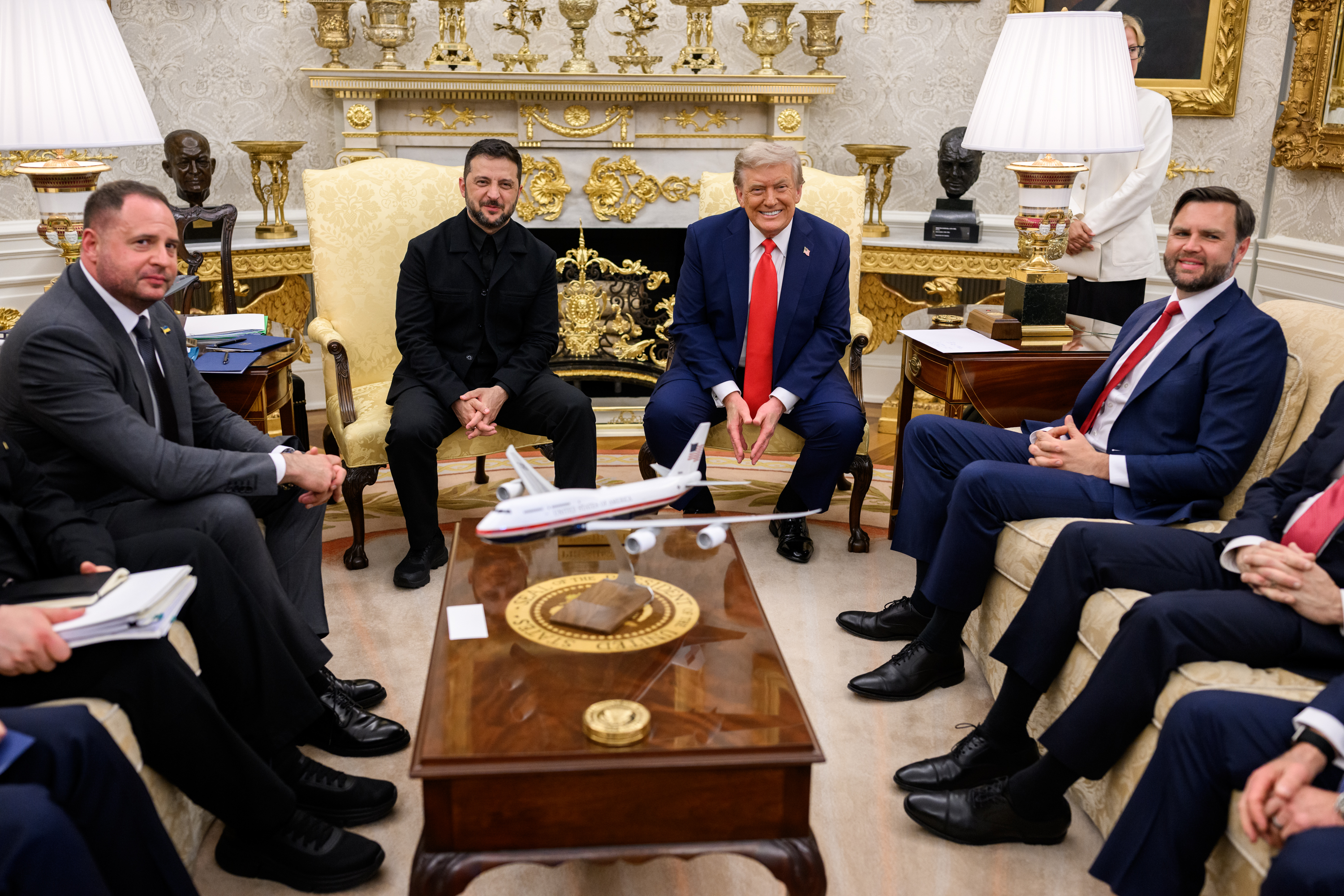
Trump and Ukrainian president Volodymyr Zelenskyy in the Oval Office, August 18, 2025

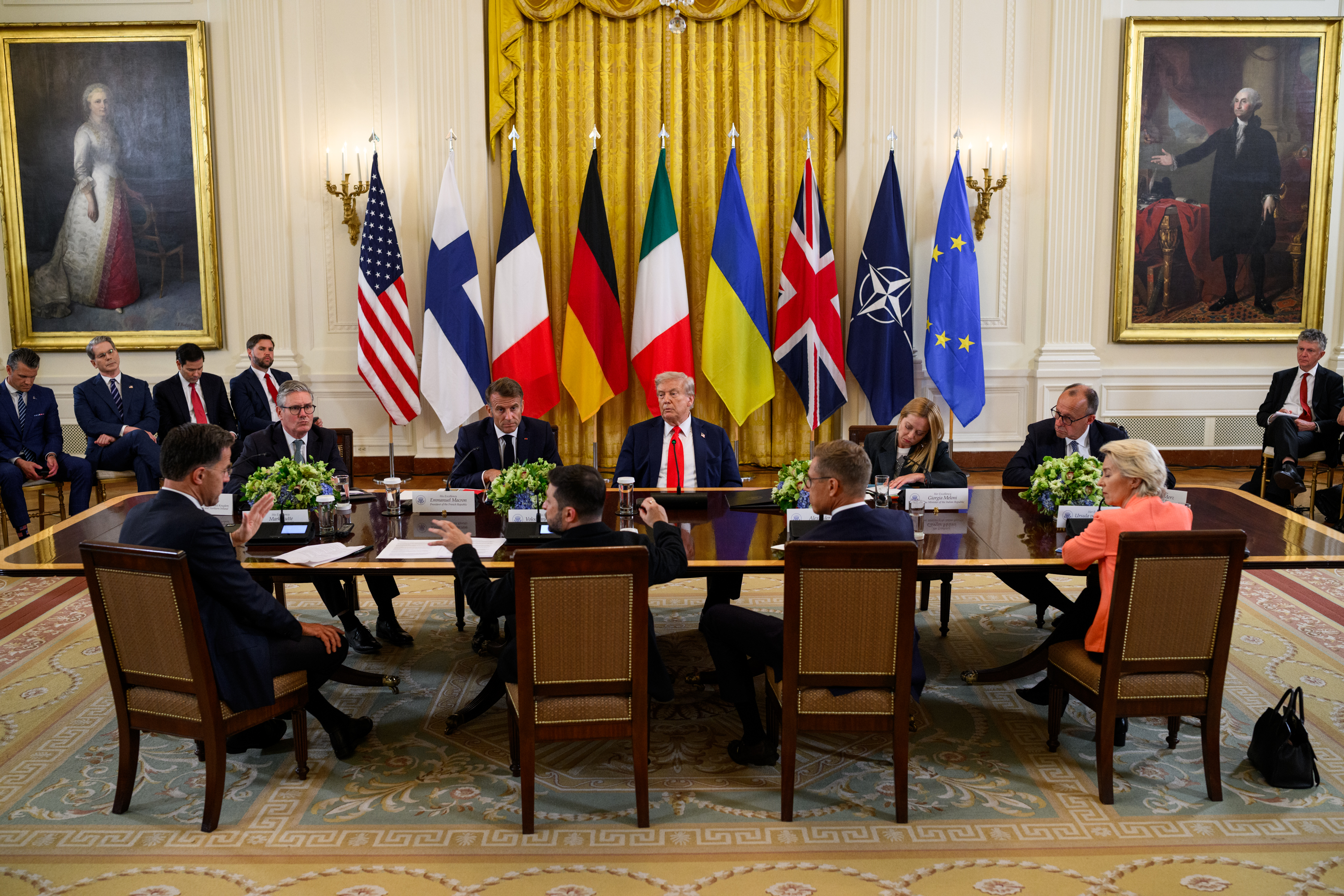
EU, NATO members and Zelenskyy in Washington D.C., August 18, 2025

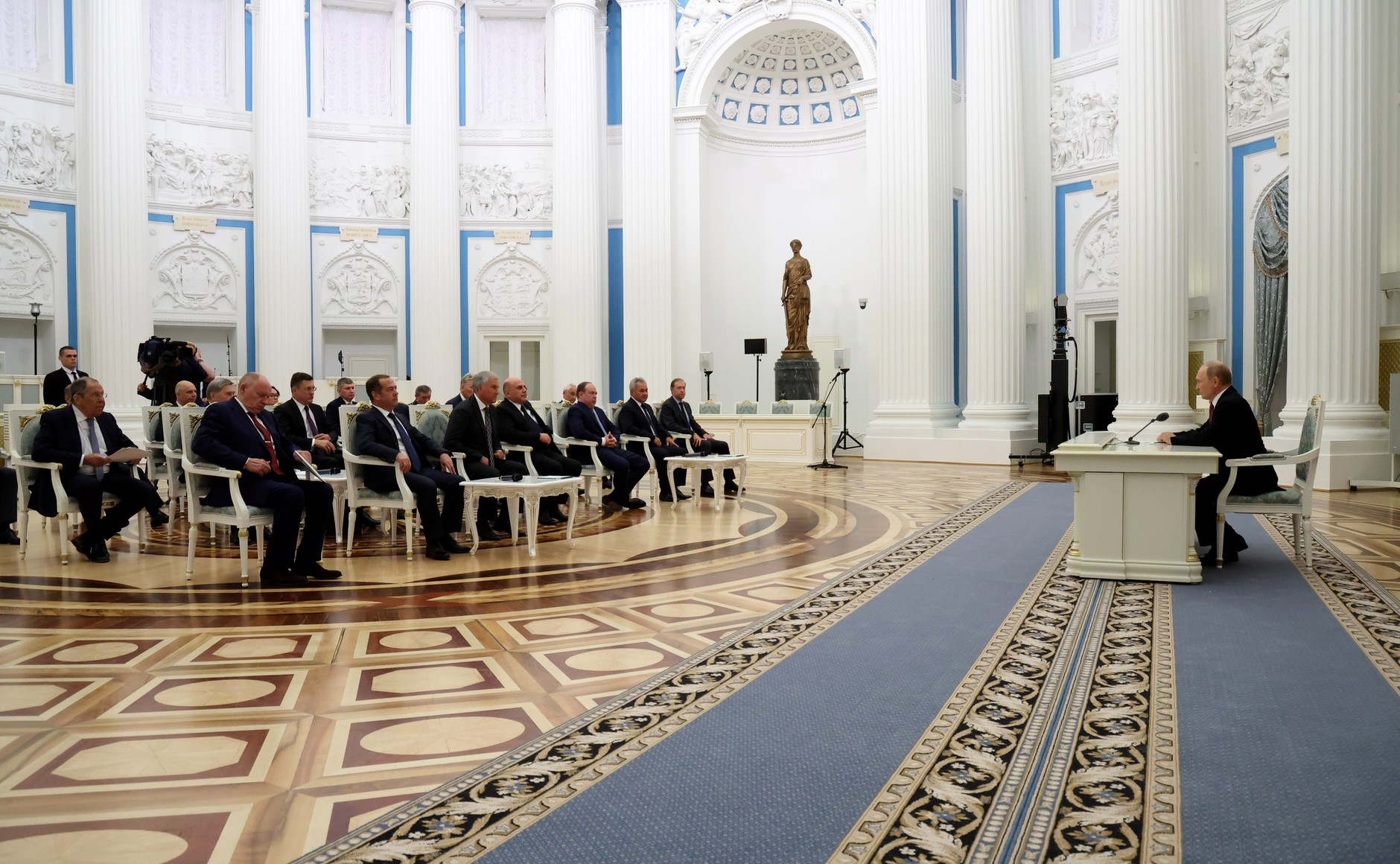
Putin holds a meeting with high-ranking members of Russian government on the outcomes of the summit, August 16, 2025

Following the meeting, Trump and Rubio downplayed the chances of increasing sanctions on Russia. On August 17, Trump said that responsibility for peace fell on Zelenskyy, while saying that Ukraine should not regain Crimea or join NATO. On August 18 numerous European leaders arrived at the White House for what the BBC said amounted to a wartime summit.

A summit between Trump and Zelenskyy at the White House was held on August 18. Prior to this summit, EU leaders met with Zelenskyy at the Ukrainian embassy in Washington, D.C.

Steve Witkoff said that Putin agreed that the US could provide NATO-like protection to Ukraine. Ukrainian President Zelenskyy welcomed the United States' pledge to provide security guarantees to Ukraine. Russian Foreign Minister Sergei Lavrov demanded that Russia be included in any future security guarantee, which the Financial Times said would give it an effective veto over defence of Ukraine.

During the meeting, Putin reportedly offered to end the war if Ukraine ceded all of Donbas to Russia, but Zelenskyy rejected territorial concessions.

In August 2025, U.S.-Russia relations showed signs of renewal after Presidents Trump and Putin met in Alaska and voiced interest in economic cooperation. According to a The Wall Street Journal report, ExxonMobil and Rosneft held "secret talks" to restart joint operations at Sakhalin-1, tied to Ukraine peace talks. Exxon CEO Darren Woods held direct talks with Trump at the White House and received a "sympathetic hearing" regarding the company's return to Russia.

In September 2025, Trump changed his position and took a more pro-Ukrainian stance.

In October 2025 Deputy Foreign Minister of Russia Sergey Ryabkov said that "The powerful momentum of Anchorage [summit] in favor of agreements has been largely exhausted by the efforts of opponents and the efforts of supporters of the "war to the last Ukrainian" [strategy] among Europeans", de facto stating the failure of negotiations.

On November 19, 2025, Axios reported that Witkoff had discussed a new draft 28-point U.S. peace plan with Russian envoy Kirill Dmitriev in Miami over three days October 24 to 26. The plan was a wide framework encompassing security guarantees, security in Europe, and future Russia–U.S. relations, based on the principles discussed in the Alaska summit.

The "spirit of Anchorage" emerged as diplomatic slogan used mainly by Russian officials to signify the common understandings that - according to Dmitry Peskov - were achieved at this meeting and could advance the peace process. However, by mid 2026, after no peace agreement had been achieved, Putin's foreign policy aide Yuri Ushakov distanced himself from it, stating that "I have never used that phrase."

== Analysis ==
Trump's minimum expectation of a temporary cease-fire was not achieved ("We didn't get there"), whereas Putin had regained his stature on the world stage, with The Guardian describing the summit as a gift for Putin. Jonathan Lemire, writing for The Atlantic, stated, "That the summit happened at all was perceived by many as a victory for Putin, who, after years as an international pariah, was granted a photo with a U.S. president on American soil ... And he was greeted in an over-the-top, stage-managed welcome that involved a literal red carpet for a man accused of war crimes." Lemire interviewed John Bolton, a first-term Trump national security advisor, who said, "I think Trump did not lose, but Putin clearly won. Putin got everything he could have wished for, but he's not home free yet. Zelensky and the Europeans must be dismayed. And I thought Trump looked very tired at the press event. Putin looked energetic."

Diplomatic journalist Steven Erlanger wrote in The New York Times that while European fears had not come to pass, its strategic position was no better. According to The Economist, the summit's most obvious development was Trump's pivot, from threatening Russia with "crippling sanctions" if the summit didn't yield a ceasefire, to accepting Russian demands for a full end to the war. According to The Wall Street Journal, "[Putin] ended his isolation in the West, made no public concessions, and can continue killing Ukrainians without further sanction."

The editorial board Financial Times called the summit an "embarrassing failure" for Trump, and said that by not rejecting Putin's demand for Ukraine to cede further territory in Donetsk, Trump would leave Ukraine exposed to further Russian aggression. In its view, the two possible explanations for Trump's actions are either that "his mind is simply shaped by the last conversation he has had", or that Trump has always been sympathetic to Russia's ambition for territorial conquest; namely, "a world in which the strong triumph over the weak".

Chinese analysts have said that China would likely face "increasing" geopolitical pressure if the United States and Europe provide NATO-style security guarantees to Ukraine.

== Delegations ==
=== United States delegation ===
On August 15, the United States announced their list of delegates:

- President of the United States, Donald Trump
- (United States) Secretary of State, Marco Rubio
- (United States) Secretary of Treasury, Scott Bessent
- (United States) Chairman of the Joint Chiefs of Staff, Dan Caine
- (United States) Secretary of Commerce, Howard Lutnick
- (United States) Secretary of Defense, Pete Hegseth
- (United States) Director of the Central Intelligence Agency, John Ratcliffe
- United States Special Envoy to the Middle East, Steve Witkoff

=== Russian delegation ===
On August 14, the Kremlin announced their list of delegates:

- (Russia) President of the Russian Federation, Vladimir Putin
- (Russia) Foreign Affairs Minister, Sergey Lavrov
- (Russia) Defence Minister, Andrey Belousov
- (Russia) Finance Minister, Anton Siluanov
- Aide to the President of Russia for Foreign Policy, Yuri Ushakov
- (Russia) Special Presidential Envoy on Foreign Investment and Economic Cooperation, Kirill Dmitriev

== Russian offer ==
Reuters reported that the Russian offer included:

- Territorial
  - Ukrainian withdrawal from Donetsk Oblast (~6,600 km^{2})
  - Freezing the frontlines in Kherson and Zaporizhzhia Oblasts
  - Russian withdrawal from Kharkiv and Sumy Oblasts (~400 km^{2})
- Diplomatic
  - Barring Ukraine from joining NATO
  - Recognition of Russian annexation of Crimea (unclear if also required from European countries)
  - Lifting of some sanctions against Russia (unclear if also required from European countries)
- Other
  - Official status of the Russian language in some or all of Ukraine
  - Right of the Russian Orthodox Church to operate freely in Ukraine

== See also ==
- February 2025 United States–Russia Summit in Saudi Arabia – Meeting between the US and Russia on February 18, 2025
- 2025 Trump–Zelenskyy Oval Office meeting – Meeting between the presidents of Ukraine and the U.S. on February 28, 2025
- August 2025 White House multilateral meeting on Ukraine – Meeting between European leaders and the U.S. president over Ukraine on August 18, 2025
- 2025 Budapest Summit – Proposed meeting between Donald Trump and Vladimir Putin in Hungary
- Détente – Relaxation of strained international relations by verbal communication
- Peace negotiations in the Russo-Ukrainian war
- Foreign policy of the second Trump administration § Russia and Ukraine
- United States and the Russian invasion of Ukraine
- List of Russia–United States summits
