= Peter Dickinson (disambiguation) =

Peter Dickinson (1927–2015) was a British author

Peter Dickinson may also refer to:

- Peter Dickinson (architect) (1925–1961), Canadian architect
- Peter Dickinson (musician) (1934–2023), British composer
