= Tatiana Stanovaya =

Russian political scientist

Tatiana Stanovaya (Russian: Татьяна Становая, born 1978) is a Russian political scientist.

== Biography ==
Stanovaya was born in Moscow in 1978.

In 1998, she began working for the Russian company Severstal as a political analyst. In 2000, she graduated from the International University and was independent of Environment and Politics. The same year, she joined TsK, a public relations company that provides political analysis notes to one of Russia's steel producers. In 2005, she completed studies at Moscow State University with a specialty in state administration and municipal administration.

From 2005, she joined the Center for Political Technologies, a Russian political consulting firm, where she was appointed head of the analysis department. In 2010, she settled in France where she continued her work on behalf of the Centre for Political Technologies.

In 2018, she founded R. Politik in France, a political analysis firm focused on Russia.

In June 2019, she joined the Moscow Carnegie Center as a non-resident researcher.In October 2019, she wrote an article in Politico in which she stated that she believed Vladimir Putin thought if Donald Trump won reelection in 2020, it would benefit Russian interests.

In February 2021, she said that the decrease in support for Vladimir Putin was not only caused by the political activity of Alexei Navalny and his supporters, but also by three other factors: six years of income declines, a deterioration in social conditions and less popular enthusiasm for the annexation of Crimea in 2014. In December 2021, she declared that Vladimir Putin's government had decided to eliminate any internal opposition to its political projects, demonstrating its decision to no longer support a form of democracy within Russia.

In the wake of a pronounced tension between Russia, Europe and the United States, she declared in January 2022: "Russia is realizing the obvious: regardless of the state of the conflict in eastern Ukraine, Kiev is constantly getting closer to NATO and their military cooperation is united. Russia [...] decided that it was necessary to adopt a radical approach to reverse the trend."

In 2022, she published a bimonthly bulletin on Russian politics. By 2022, she had published more than 2,000 articles on Russia's domestic and foreign policy.

In 2023, she said that, following the prolongation of the war in Ukraine, Russian political elites were less enthusiastic about Putin's leadership. She mentions that many people believe that the Russian political system is highly dependent on Putin, while it depends for many on the Russian political elites who are able to continue the current regime with or without Putin. It classifies political elites into two categories: technocrats and patriots. The former support the regime by passively executing orders, while the latter believe that Russia would be better if there were more repression and greater militarization. According to Stanovaya, in the event of defeat in Ukraine, the elites fear for their security, while the people fear a NATO attack. She says that the sanctions imposed on Russia do not prevent everyday businesses from operating. They would only strengthen the feeling of doing well among the elites and increase the population's support for war. However, she fears that the regime will self-destruct because the elites would live in a world disconnected from international geopolitical reality.
