= Zelimkhan Khangoshvili =

Georgian Chechen soldier and alleged war criminal (1979–2019)

- Хангин Султан-кIант Зелимхан
- Born: 15 August 1979; Duisi, Akhmeta Municipality, Georgian SSR, Soviet Union
- Died: 23 August 2019 (aged 40); Kleiner Tiergarten, Berlin, Germany
- Military career
- Allegiance: Chechen Republic of Ichkeria; Georgia
- Service years: 2001–2005; 2007–2012
- Rank: Field commander
- Conflicts: Second Chechen War; Russo-Georgian War

Zelimkhan Sultanovich Khangoshvili (Chechen: Хангин Султан-кIант Зелимхан, Georgian: ზელიმხან სულთანის ძე ხანგოშვილი, romanized: zelimkhan sultanis dze khangoshvili, Russian: Зелимхан Султанович Хангошвили; 15 August 1979 – 23 August 2019) was an ethnic Chechen born in Georgia who was a former platoon commander for the Chechen Republic of Ichkeria as a volunteer during the Second Chechen War, and a Georgian military officer during the 2008 Russo-Georgian War. Later on, he allegedly turned into a useful source of information for the Georgian Intelligence Service by identifying Russian spies and jihadists operating on domestic and foreign soil to Georgian intelligence agents. Khangoshvili was considered a terrorist by the Government of the Russian Federation, the Federal Security Service (FSB RF), and wanted in Russia. On 23 August 2019, Khangoshvili was assassinated in Kleiner Tiergarten, a park in Berlin, by FSB operative Vadim Krasikov.

== Life ==
Zelimkhan Khangoshvili was born into the family of Sultan Khangoshvili on 15 August 1979, in the Duisi village of the Pankisi Gorge, a region of Georgia home to a large ethnic Chechen population known as the Kists. He was the nephew of Chechen and Kist historian Khaso Khangoshvili. Zelimkhan finished school in Pankisi and later went to work in Chechnya, the residence of his elder brother Zurab, in the late 1990s. Chechnya was at the time known as the Chechen Republic of Ichkeria, a de facto independent break-away republic of Russia.

In 2001, after the outbreak of the Second Chechen War, Khangoshvili joined the self proclaimed Chechen Republic of Ichkeria in their fight against Russia. He was a field commander and had close ties to former Chechen president Aslan Maskhadov, who was killed in March 2005 in a raid by the Federal Security Service (FSB RF). Khangoshvili's brother, Zurab, confirmed that Zelimkhan participated in the 2004 Nazran raid on security, military and police forces in the Russian Republic of Ingushetia that neighbours Chechnya. Zelimkhan was reportedly wounded in the leg during this battle. Russian president Vladimir Putin claimed that he was one of the perpetrators of a Moscow metro bombing. Zelimkhan denied that he was ever responsible for war crimes, telling Georgian media, "The Russians are blaming me for many things, including terrorist attacks. This is a lie. No one can provide any evidence that a single civilian was injured or killed in any of my actions!"

After returning to Georgia, Khangoshvili commanded an anti-terror military unit in South Ossetia during the 2008 war, but his unit was never deployed. In 2016, Khangoshvili, his wife, and four children sought refuge in Germany after several attempts on his life in Georgia, which his brother believes were orchestrated by Russian intelligence, although the accusation has been denied by Russian authorities.

== Assassination ==
On 23 August 2019, at around midday in the Kleiner Tiergarten park in Berlin, Khangoshvili was walking down a wooded path on his way back from the mosque he attended when he was shot three times—once in the shoulder and twice in the head—by a Russian assassin on a bicycle with a suppressed Glock 26. The bicycle, a plastic bag with the murder weapon, and a wig the perpetrator was using were dumped into the Spree. The suspect, identified as 56-year-old Russian national "Vadim Sokolov" by German police, was apprehended soon after the assassination. The Russian government and Chechen leader Ramzan Kadyrov have both been linked to the killing.

Khangoshvili's body was later transported to Georgia, and was buried in his birth village on 29 August 2019.

=== Krasikov identified as Khangoshvili's assassin ===
Khangoshvili's assassin, detained by German police, traveled on a valid Russian passport issued under the fake identity of Vadim Sokolov. Reports by Der Spiegel and other media disclosed that the suspect traveled from Moscow to Paris to Warsaw, where he rented a hotel room for five days, during which he traveled to Berlin. Sokolov's passport was issued without any biometric data, the inclusion of which has been the default option for all Russian passports since 2009, except "in emergency situations when the applicant has no time to wait for the fingerprint encryption and printing process". The Daily Beast noted that "20 GRU operatives outed by the independent investigative research network Bellingcat in recent years, including those suspected of poisoning the Skripals in England, had used these 'old-style' passports in ultimately futile attempts to hide their cover identities."

The research network Bellingcat and the investigative authorities concluded that Sokolov was actually Vadim Krasikov, born in August 1965 in the then Kazakh Soviet Socialist Republic. Krasikov was also named as a suspect in the murder of a Russian businessman on 19 June 2013 in Moscow. The murder was recorded by a surveillance camera and had a similar pattern: a cyclist murdered the businessman from behind with a head shot. The Russian Interpol red notice on 23 April 2014 against Krasikov was withdrawn on 7 July 2015 without a reason. Investigations reported by Bellingcat suggest that Krasikov was a member of the elite unit Vympel. Police investigations in connection with the murder in Berlin revealed that Sokolov and Krasikov are the same person. No personal connections between him and Khangoshvili were found to exist.

On 4 December 2019, the Federal Attorney General (Public Prosecutor General) took over the investigation into the case. This was justified by the fact that "there were sufficient factual indications that the killing of Tornike K. [Zelimkhan Khangoshvili's alias] was either commissioned by government agencies of Russia or those of the Chechen Republic as part of the Russian Federation. On the same day, two members of the military intelligence service (GRU) in the Russian Embassy in Berlin were expelled from the country in connection with the investigation."

On 6 December 2019, several media outlets reported that the German Federal Intelligence Service (BND) received credible information that a Russian secret service agent was attempting to kill Krasikov while in remand to prevent possible statements from him; as a result, Krasikov was moved from the JVA Moabit to the high-security wing of the JVA Tegel.

In February 2020, Bellingcat reported that it suspected that the operation had been supported by the FSB RF, both with training and the false passport.

In June 2020, the federal prosecutor general brought charges against a Russian citizen, called the act a contract killing, and accused the Government of the Russian Federation as the mastermind behind Khangishvili's murder. According to the prosecution, the background to the killing order was Khangoshvili's opposition to the Russian Federation's Central Government, the governments of its autonomous republics Chechnya and Ingushetia, and the pro-Russian government of the Republic of Georgia. This was followed by a conversation between the Russian ambassador to Germany with the German Foreign Office. According to Bellingcat, the prosecution also named "Roman D." as a possible accomplice, in accord with their suspicion that more than one person was involved in the murder. Bellingcat pointed out that deliberately false references to the identity of the suspect had been circulated.

=== Trial and verdict of Krasikov ===
On 15 December 2021, a Berlin court found Krasikov guilty of murder and sentenced him to life imprisonment without automatic parole. The court also determined that the murder was ordered by the Russian government as a "state-contracted killing".

Krasikov's legal fees were paid by Pravfond, a Kremlin-linked legal defence foundation.

=== Diplomatic repercussions ===
On 4 December 2019, the German Federal Foreign Office accused Russia of refusing to cooperate in the investigation of the Khangoshvili murder and expelled two Russian foreign office diplomatic employees working in Berlin. An official request for assistance in the case was submitted to Russia two days after the expulsion. In response, Russia expelled two German diplomats on 12 December.

On 10 August 2020, the Slovak Foreign Ministry announced that three diplomats from the Russian embassy in Bratislava were to be expelled from the country by 13 August. Slovak authorities noted information provided by Slovak intelligence services that "[the diplomats'] activities were in contradiction with the Vienna convention on diplomatic relations," according to a Slovak foreign ministry spokesman. He also added that "there had been an abuse of visas issued at the Slovak general consulate in St Petersburg, and in this connection a serious crime was committed on the territory of another EU and NATO member state".

In December 2021, two Russian diplomats were expelled after a Berlin court determined that the murder was a state-ordered killing. Foreign Minister Annalena Baerbock called the murder a “grave breach of German law and the sovereignty of the Federal Republic of Germany” and summoned Russia’s ambassador in Berlin to discuss the court’s conclusion.

At the end of July 2022, Russia demanded the release of imprisoned Russians in exchange for the release of two imprisoned US citizens. According to CNN, the Russian government demanded the release of Russian arms dealer Viktor Bout, who had served 10 years of a 25-year federal prison sentence in the United States, and the convicted Russian assassin of Khangoshvili, Vadim Krasikov, who was serving a life sentence in Germany until the 2024 Russian prisoner exchange. The US requested the release of US basketball player Brittney Griner, imprisoned in Russia on minor drug charges and former US Marine Paul Whelan, serving 16 years in Russia for espionage. In July 2022, US Secretary of State Antony Blinken called Sergei Lavrov for the first time since the start of Russia’s invasion of Ukraine. Blinken made an offer from the US to secure the release of Griner and Whelan. In December 2022, Griner was exchanged for Bout. According to the German television news programme Tagesschau, it was then unlikely that Krasikov would be returned to Russia.

=== Prisoner exchange of Krasikov ===
Putin reiterated in a February 2024 interview that he desired Krasikov in return for imprisoned American Evan Gershkovich (accused of espionage). In the same interview, Putin accused Khangoshvili of running over the heads of Russian soldiers in a truck.

On 24 May 2024, DW News broadcast a piece which related that Alexei Navalny and Evan Gershkovich had in early 2024 almost been exchanged for Krasikov.

Family members of Paul Whelan, arrested in Russia in 2018 and sentenced to 16 years in prison on espionage charges, have said that Whelan had initially been told that he had been arrested to be exchanged for a Russian prisoner in the United States, mentioning Konstantin Yaroshenko (who was later released in exchange for American Trevor Reed), Viktor Bout, or Roman Seleznev.

In July 2024 rumors about a possible prisoner exchange rekindled when Belarus president pardoned Rico Krieger, who had been facing a death sentence. The rumours appeared to be confirmed when an Antonov-148 tail number RA-61727, which had been used to exchange Viktor Bout for Brittney Griner, landed at Kaliningrad airport on 31 July.

On 1 August, Krasikov was freed in a large prisoner exchange with several European countries and the US, along with several other convicted Russian nationals, in exchange for the release of a number of prisoners in Russia and Belarus, including Russian dissidents and German nationals. Vladimir Putin greeted Krasikov with a hug on the tarmac, and on 2 August the Kremlin officially recognized the assassin as an FSB operative. However, at least one of the prisoners involved in the prisoner exchange, Ilya Yashin, would condemn the fact that Krasikov was involved in the large prisoner exchange.

=== Deportation of the Khangoshvili family ===
In October 2025, Germany deported relatives of Zelimkhan Khangoshvili under its stricter asylum stance and Georgia's 2023 "safe country" designation. Critics from asylum rights groups and civil society have voiced concerns that the Khangoshvili family members, especially his brother Zurab, may face danger in Georgia amid the country's democratic backsliding and increasing pressure on opposition and critics.

== See also ==
- List of Russian assassinations
- Amina Okueva
- Sulim Yamadayev
- Zelimkhan Yandarbiyev
- Umar Israilov
