= Krasikov =

Krasikov (Russian: Красиков), or Krasikova (feminine; Красикова), is a Russian surname. Notable people with the surname include:

- Anatoly Krasikov (1931–2020), Russian political scientist and journalist
- Mikhail Krasikov (born 1959), Ukrainian poet
- Pyotr Krasikov (1870–1939), Russian politician
- Vadim Krasikov, murderer of Zelimkhan Khangoshvili
- Vassili Krassikov (1911–1965; after 1936 Vello Kaaristo), Estonian cross-country skier

== See also ==
- Krasíkov (Ústí nad Orlicí District), village and municipality in the Czech Republic
