= Rico Krieger =

Alleged German saboteur for Belarusian opposition

- Born: 1994 or 1995 (age 31–32) (Note: Conflicting reports during his imprisonment state Krieger was either 29 or 30 years old during the incident); Berlin, Germany
- Occupation: Rescue medic
- Employer: German Red Cross

Detention
- Country: Belarus
- Detained: 6 October 2023
- Trial: 6 June 2024
- Charge: "Mercenary activity", "agent activity", + 4 other charges (Note: Krieger has been sentenced for breaking six articles of the Criminal Code of Belarus: "Mercenary activity" (article 133), "Terrorism" (part 3 of article 289), "Illegal actions with respect to firearms, ammunition, and explosives" (part 4 of article 295), "Intentional disrepair of a vehicle or communication lines" (part 4 article 309), "agent activity" (article 358–1), "Joining an extremist formation in order to commit an extremist crime" (part 3 of article 361–1).)
- Released: 1 August 2024
- Sentence: Death
- Time held: 9 months and 26 days

Rico Krieger is a German citizen most notable for his reported sabotage work inside Belarus for the Security Service of Ukraine (SBU) and Kastuś Kalinoŭski Regiment, subsequent detainment, and release during the 2024 Ankara prisoner exchange.

Before his detainment, Krieger worked as a rescue medic for the German Red Cross but reportedly had a desire to aid Ukraine after witnessing Russia's aggression during their invasion of the nation on the news. After contacting the SBU with a desire to join the Kastuś Kalinoŭski Regiment, a Belarusian opposition military regiment, the SBU supposedly tasked Krieger with a reconnaissance and sabotage mission inside of Belarus as a prerequisite to joining, according to Belarusian authorities. On 2 October 2023, Krieger arrived in Belarus to take photos and record coordinates of military objects in the Mogilev Region. He ended his mission by placing a backpack filled with explosives on the railway station in Asipovichy, (Note: As a result of the various systems of Romanization employed by different languages for transliterating Belarusian Cyrillic, "Asipovitshy", "Asipovičy", "Asipovitšy", "Azyaryshcha", and "Aziaryščy" all refer to the Belarusian city of Asipovichy, the railway, or its surrounding area.) which after detonating, damaged the tracks but caused no injuries. While attempting to leave the country on 6 October, Krieger was detained at Minsk National Airport.

His subsequent trial, which began eight months later on 6 June 2024, saw Krieger charged with six crimes: including "mercenary activity", "terrorism", and "agent activity". He was found guilty on all counts and given the death penalty through execution by firing squad, the first time this verdict had ever been given to a foreign citizen. Its severity was immediately challenged by the German government and human rights groups alike. On 25 July 2024, Krieger appeared on Belarusian state-run TV in a plea to ask Belarusian President Alexander Lukashenko for a pardon, a move likely done in duress for propaganda purposes. The plea brought more attention to his case internationally, and by 30 July, Krieger was pardoned by Lukashenko. Two days later, he was traded for the detained Russian Federal Security Service (FSB) officer and hitman Vadim Krasikov, and returned to Germany as part of the 2024 Ankara prisoner exchange, with Krieger being the only western prisoner coming from a nation other than Russia.

Since his return, Krieger has been involved in an investigation which aims to determine his guilt on the matter, as well as his purpose for traveling to Belarus. While it was unknown during his detainment how many of his confessions were done under duress, Krieger has claimed since returning he both took reconnaissance photos and placed the backpack under direction from the SBU, but was never a part of the Kastuś Kalinoŭski Regiment despite Belarusian claims, and insists he was unaware the contents of the bag he placed would cause an explosion. The situation has highlighted modern day Belarusian misinformation tactics, and has been a strain on Belarus–Germany relations.

== Biography ==
Krieger is a German citizen born in Berlin. He has one child, a daughter. Between 2015 and 2016, Krieger worked as an armed security officer for Pond Security at the US embassy in Berlin, where he familiarized himself with operations security. During this time, Krieger reportedly had plans to apply for a US passport and migrate to the US. He instead left the embassy to work in healthcare as a nurse, and eventually specialized as an emergency medical technician (EMT).

Before his arrest, Krieger was a 29- or 30-year-old rescue medic for the German Red Cross (DRK), but reportedly also had intentions to serve as a military doctor in the Kastuś Kalinoŭski Regiment, a Belarusian opposition military regiment formed to defend Ukraine following Russia's invasion in 2022. These intentions reportedly formed after witnessing the Russian aggression in the news. Through attempting to join the regiment, Krieger made contact with the Security Service of Ukraine (SBU), for which he later carried out his mission supposedly as a prerequisite to joining. Some independent publications, however, challenged the validity of this information provided by Belarusian state media, including the unlikely circumstances of his mission, as foreign volunteers for Ukraine had never been known to require the execution of such risky missions as an initiation to join. It was also unclear whether Krieger ever joined the Kastuś Kalinoŭski Regiment in the first place. In his later trial, Krieger was charged with "terrorism" for being part of the Regiment, designated as a terrorist organization by Belarus, with screenshots of encrypted emails from Krieger's phone attempting to join the Regiment and other foreign units in Ukraine used as evidence. According to an investigation by the BBC, however, the email addresses used were fake, and no actual communication between Krieger and the Regiment was ever presented in court. Furthermore, after being contacted, the Kastuś Kalinoŭski Regiment replied "he is not our fighter" when referring to Krieger. In an August 2024 interview with former Belarusian police investigator Andrei Ostapovich, Ostapovich stated Krieger was likely approached by the Belarusian secret police (KGB) posing as the Kastuś Kalinoŭski Regiment to lure out incriminating statements, something the KGB had a history of performing.

=== Activities leading to detention ===
According to Belarusian authorities and confessions he later made, Krieger received orders from the SBU no later than 20 September 2023 to carry out the mission. He arrived in Belarus on 2 October 2023 under the persona of a tourist, reportedly carrying phones and a drone. The German Red Cross stated that Krieger's travel to Belarus was unrelated to his work with them. Likewise, a former colleague from the Red Cross stated when Krieger told them he had been recruited to travel to Ukraine, "we all assumed that he was going as a medic". Under orders from the SBU, Krieger first traveled to the Mogilev Region, and then to the railway station in Asipovichy to take reconnaissance photos and record the coordinates of military objects. The city of Asipovichy and the surrounding area were all known locations for hosting Belarusian and Wagner PMC military elements, with the railway station serving as a crucial hub for transporting military equipment around the capital Minsk. These tasks were reportedly completed, and the data collected was sent to the SBU over the internet. Krieger recounted this reconnaissance work for the SBU is true, even after returning from his later detainment.

On 5 October, Krieger was instructed by the SBU by phone to find a pre-placed backpack filled with explosives, and place it on the railway. At 11:22 pm, Krieger carried out the plan, causing an explosion at the railway station in an attempt to "influence decision-making by authorities, intimidate the population, [and] destabilize public order" according to Belarusian authorities. These crimes were later reflected in his trial and sentencing. The explosion did not result in any death or injuries, but was powerful enough to be heard 8 km (5.0 mi) from the railway, and successfully damaged the railway track and switching mechanism which connected the station's main line to the freight yard which handles military equipment. The following day on 6 October at the Minsk National Airport, Krieger was detained while waiting for his flight back to Germany and placed under police custody. No information regarding his detainment was released to the public until his trial began in June of the following year.

=== Trial and sentencing ===
Prominent figures involved in Krieger's trial

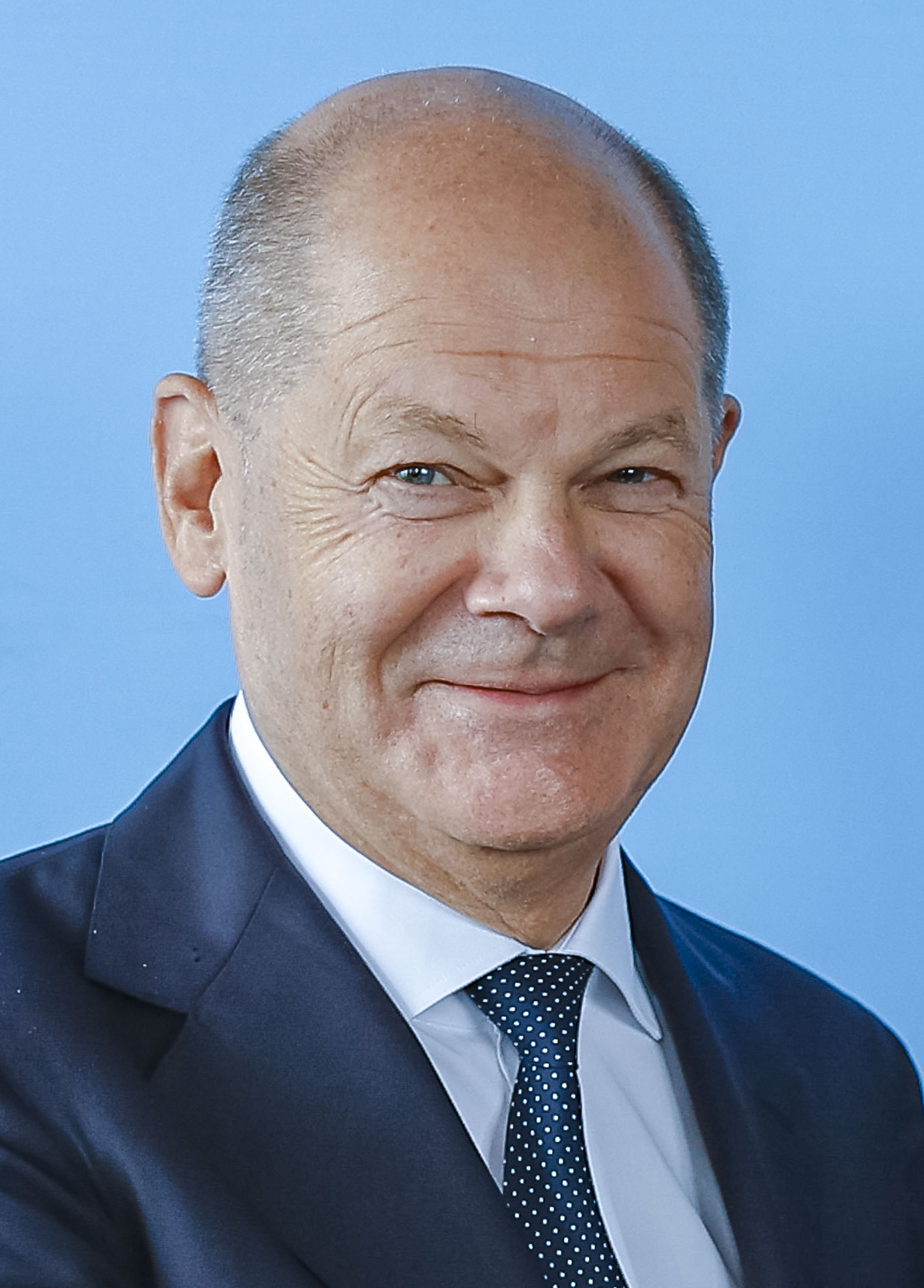
Chancellor of Germany Olaf Scholz

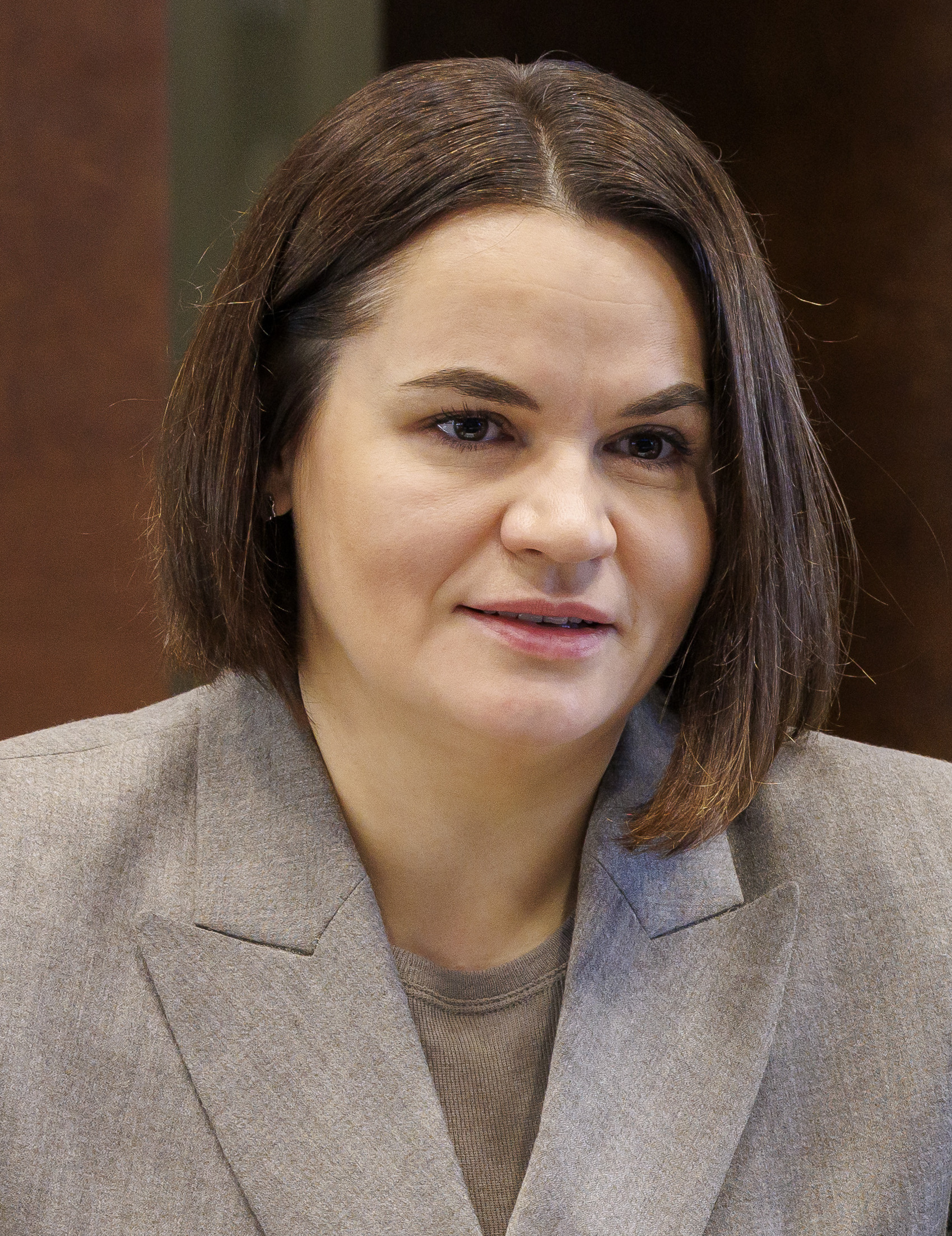
Belarusian political activist Sviatlana Tsikhanouskaya

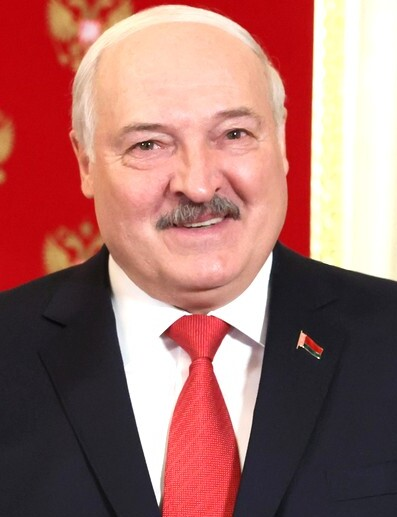
President of Belarus Alexander Lukashenko

All pictured in 2024, the same year as the trial

On 6 June 2024, Krieger was put on trial at the Minsk Regional Court for breaking six articles of the Criminal Code of Belarus: including "mercenary activity" (article 133), "terrorism" (part 3 of article 289), "illegal actions with respect to firearms, ammunition, and explosives" (part 4 of article 295), "intentional disrepair of a vehicle or communication lines" (part 4 article 309), "agent activity" (article 358–1), and "joining an extremist formation in order to commit an extremist crime" (part 3 of article 361–1). Of the charges, Krieger only pleaded guilty to "agent activity", but refused to testify. The case was largely held as a public trial, but had some case materials discussed in secret, and independent media journalists were not present. The judge for the trial was Aleh Lapeka of the Regional Court, the state prosecutor was supported by Tatsiana Hrakun of Prosecutor General's Office, and Krieger's lawyer was Vladimir Gorbach (Note: Referred to as Uladzimir Horbach (transliterated from Belarusian) by the Viasna Human Rights Centre) who also worked partially as an interpreter, since Krieger spoke neither Belarusian nor Russian. Gorbach, along with others involved in the trial, refused to provide any further information or insight about the case. Evidence used against Krieger during the trial notably included testimony from the taxi driver who took Krieger to the station, as well as the recordings from surveillance cameras and information collected from Krieger's phone, but notably no surveillance footage of Krieger actually placing the backpack on the tracks has been released. During the trial process, the German Ministry for Foreign Affairs provided Krieger with prison visits and some legal support, after first being contacted by the State Security Committee of the Republic of Belarus on 27 November 2023. The trial was the first case persecuted under article 133 of the criminal code ("mercenary activity") in Belarus history.

After twelve sessions, a verdict was reached on 24 June 2024 which found Krieger guilty of breaking all six articles and sentenced to the death penalty through execution by firing squad—a more severe sentence compared to the initially prognosed sentence of up to 25 years in prison. Information regarding the outcome of the trial only leaked to human rights groups and the wider press much later on 19 July 2024, and the activities leading to his detention on 22 July. The verdict was the first time a foreign citizen was given the death penalty in Belarus. Once the verdict was released, human rights groups including the Viasna Human Rights Centre and International Federation for Human Rights immediately sought ways to lessen Krieger's sentencing, citing prior precedent of the death penalty in Belarus which had been reserved only for acts resulted in murder, something Krieger had not committed. Belarus was also the only country in Europe to still have the death penalty legal, becoming another point fought by human rights groups, the German Ministry for Foreign Affairs, and the German chancellor Olaf Scholz as being inhumane. Exiled Belarusian activist Sviatlana Tsikhanouskaya also condemned the use of the death penalty against Krieger.

Late on 25 July 2024, Krieger appeared in a 17-minute-long plea titled "Confession of a German terrorist" on the state-run television Belarus-1 in a cleaned jailcell in handcuffs, apologizing for his actions and asking the Belarusian President Alexander Lukashenko for a pardon. The plea ended with Krieger in tears, saying the bombing was his "worst mistake", and that he needed the German government to help him "before it's too late". Krieger spoke in German, but his words were voiced over by a Russian translator. The video, as pointed out by the BBC, Politico Europe, and Radio Free Europe, looked to be made in duress for propaganda purposes, as forced apology pleas on Belarusian state media had become common practice in recent years by members of the opposition, often carried out by the Belarusian secret police (KGB) through torture. In support of this claim, a BBC investigation highlighted inconsistencies in Krieger's plea, where he said he was motivated to cooperate with the SBU for a payment of €2,000 (US$2,180), a sum below what he regularly earned in Germany. Furthermore, in the plea, a photo of Krieger from his LinkedIn account was used, but with a Ukrainian flag digitally added into the background to achieve a more dramatic effect.

=== Release ===
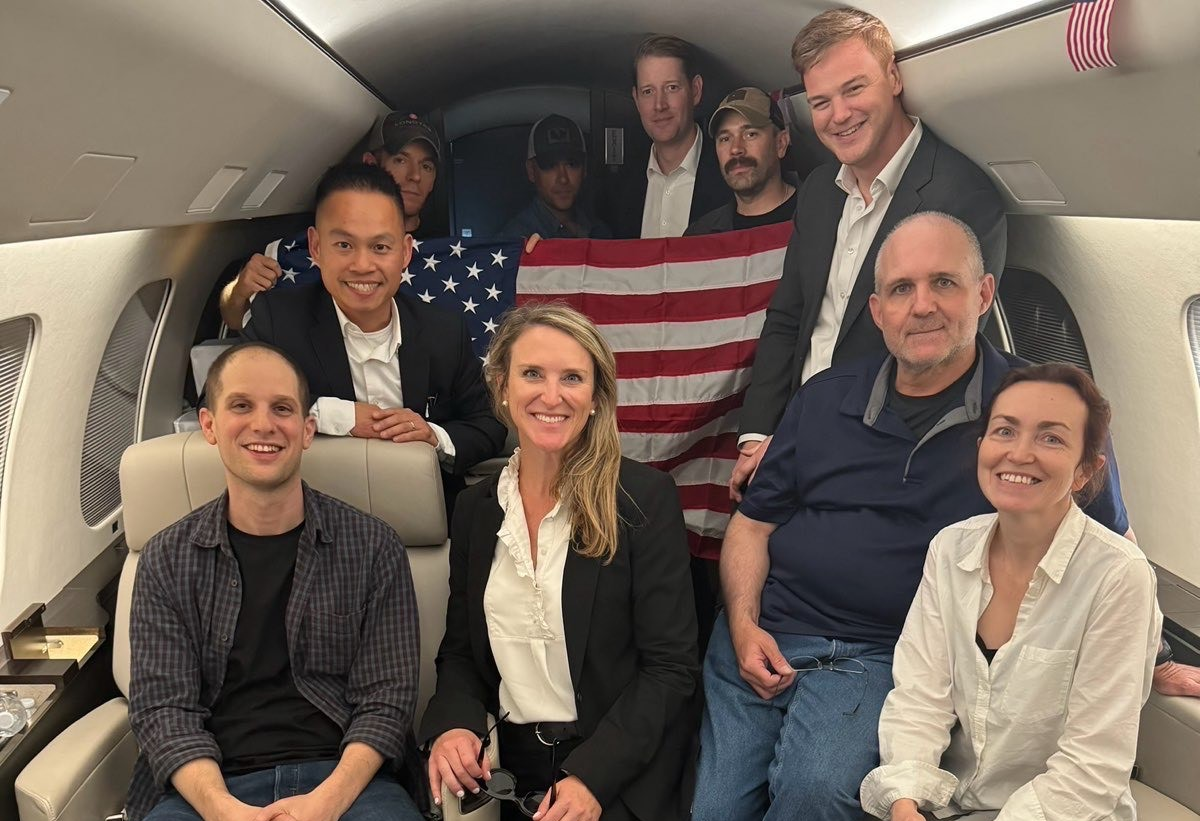
The aftermath of the prisoner exchange, with those released flying back to the United States (Krieger not pictured)

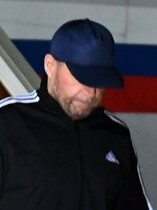
Imprisoned Russian FSB officer Vadim Krasikov, who was traded in exchange for the release of Krieger

According to Anatoly Glaz of the state-run media Belarusian Telegraph Agency (BelTA), Belarus had "proposed a number of options" to Germany to change Krieger's sentencing. Russian President Vladimir Putin had suggested a prisoner swap could be initiated to free Krieger in exchange for Vadim Krasikov, Russian Federal Security Service (FSB) officer and hitman imprisoned by Germany. The idea of a larger prisoner swap between Russia and Belarus and the west seemed more likely after American journalist Evan Gershkovich was convicted of espionage in Russia, and sentenced up to 16 years in prison around the same time as Krieger's trial. This disputed incarceration led news agencies, including the BBC, Politico Europe, and The Guardian, to accuse Russia of artificially increasing the amount of western prisoners in their custody in order to negotiate a more profitable exchange.

On 30 July 2024, Krieger was pardoned by Lukashenko in accordance with the article 96 of the criminal code, substituting his death penalty with a life sentence. Before making the pardon, Lukashenko reportedly met with five officials: Ivan Tertel, chairman of the KGB, Olga Chupris, deputy head of Lukashenko's Presidential Administration, Liudmila Hladkaya, an employee for the state-run publisher Belarus Today, and prosecutor Hrakun and defense lawyer Gorbach from the trial to gain better insight on the case. The announcement of Krieger's pardon was broadcast on the state-run All-National TV (ONT TV), in which Krieger in tears thanked Lukashenko for his decision. The move was praised by the German Ministry for Foreign Affairs and human rights activist Andrei Paluda. Belarusian state media stated that the pardon showcased Lukashenko's "wise and fair" judgment before an "unjustifiable" crime, as well as highlighted his "merciful" nature and "damned the Germans, claiming they abandoned their own".

On the same day of his pardon, seven political prisoners in Russia were removed from the detention centers without explanation, supporting the speculation about an imminent high-profile prisoner swap. Two days later on 1 August 2024, this proved to be true as Krieger was released in the 2024 Ankara prisoner exchange, which saw western countries receive 15 prisoners from Russia along with Krieger, who was the only prisoner freed from a country other than Russia. Chancellor Olaf Scholz's spokesperson, Steffen Hebestreit, said the exchange of Krasikov for Krieger had been arranged in "cooperation with the United States and European partners" and was "not taken lightly" by the German government. Krieger being the only prisoner to be exchanged from Belarus came as disappointment to human rights organizations fighting for the release of Belarusian political prisoners, estimated at the time to be around 1,400 incarcerated. This goal was partially satisfied later the same month, when on 16 August Lukashenko pardoned thirty of these political prisoners convicted of "protest-related crimes" in a decree published on 4 September.

=== Investigation back in Germany ===
On the day of Krieger's release, his spouse's apartment in Germany was searched for potential evidence. On 28 August 2024, the German Public Prosecutor General began an investigation against Krieger for allegedly causing the explosion in Belarus, a crime punishable under Section 308 of the Criminal Code of Germany "Strafgesetzbuch". Additionally, the investigation sought to determine the reason for Krieger's travel to Belarus in the first place.

In an interview with the German newspaper Welt am Sonntag in August 2024, Krieger affirmed his claims of innocence on the matter, stating he was told by Belarusian authorities, "'The only chance of saving your life is if you do exactly what we tell you.' So I confessed to everything." However, Krieger also claimed in the interview he had applied to join the Kastuś Kalinoŭski Regiment but never heard a response, had taken reconnaissance photos of military objects in Belarus for the SBU, and had been instructed by the SBU to locate a pre-placed backpack. Krieger maintained his innocence by asserting he was unaware of the contents of the backpack, and had no knowledge it would cause an explosion.
