= Tucker Carlson's interview with Vladimir Putin =

"The Vladimir Putin Interview"
- The Tucker Carlson Interview episode
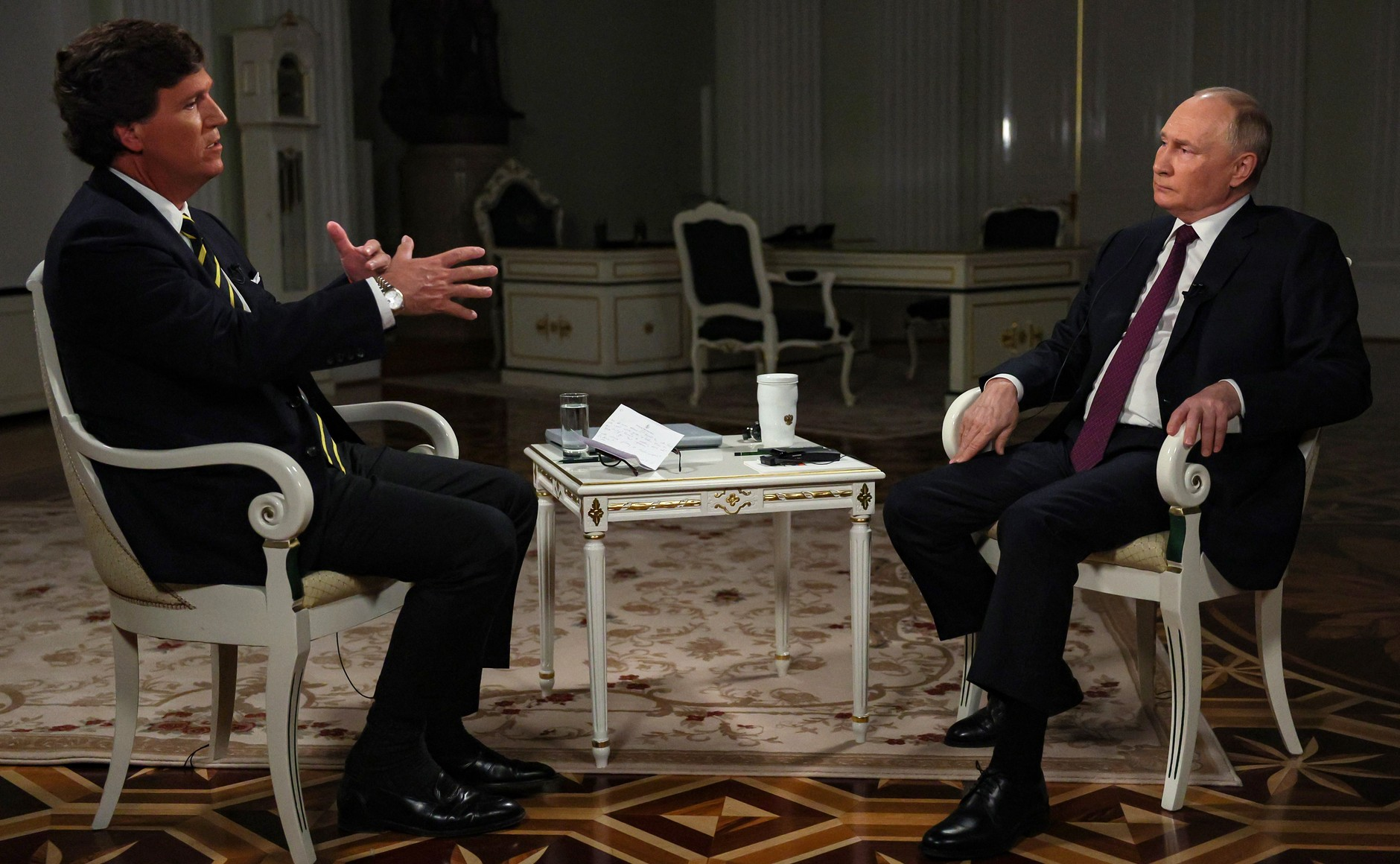
- Carlson (left) and Putin during the interview
- Episode no.: Episode 74
- Presented by: Tucker Carlson
- Original air date: February 8, 2024
- Running time: 2:07:18

Guest appearance
- Vladimir Putin

"The Vladimir Putin Interview" is a television interview hosted by the American journalist and political commentator Tucker Carlson with the Russian president Vladimir Putin. It premiered on the Tucker Carlson Network and the social media website Twitter on February 8, 2024. It is the first interview to have been conducted between Putin and a Western journalist since the Russian invasion of Ukraine began on February 24, 2022. Most of the conversation between the two men was focused on the Russo-Ukrainian War, as well as the dynamic between Russia and NATO since the dissolution of the Soviet Union in 1991. Historians have pointed out many false claims in Putin's statements.

== Background ==
Tucker Carlson is an American journalist and political commentator known for promoting conspiracy theories. Carlson said before the interview, "We are not here because we love Vladimir Putin. We are here because we love the United States." Carlson has defended Putin and has promoted pro-Russian disinformation about the war in Ukraine, including the Ukraine bioweapons conspiracy theory. From 2016 to 2023, Carlson hosted the Fox News program Tucker Carlson Tonight, a talk show in which he was critical of Ukraine, describing its president since 2019, Volodymyr Zelenskyy, as a "dictator." In April 2023, Carlson was dismissed from Fox News. He then established Tucker on X. The first episode attributed the destruction of the Kakhovka Dam to Ukraine.

Putin has instituted restrictions on press freedom in Russia. In March 2023, the Russian government imprisoned an American journalist, Evan Gershkovich of The Wall Street Journal, on charges of espionage. Since the Russian invasion of Ukraine, Putin had not granted an interview to any Western journalist. The Kremlin Press Secretary, Dmitry Peskov, said Carlson had been allowed an interview because "his position is different," saying, "It's not pro-Russian, not pro-Ukrainian, it's pro-American. It starkly contrasts with the stance of traditional Anglo-Saxon media."

== Production ==
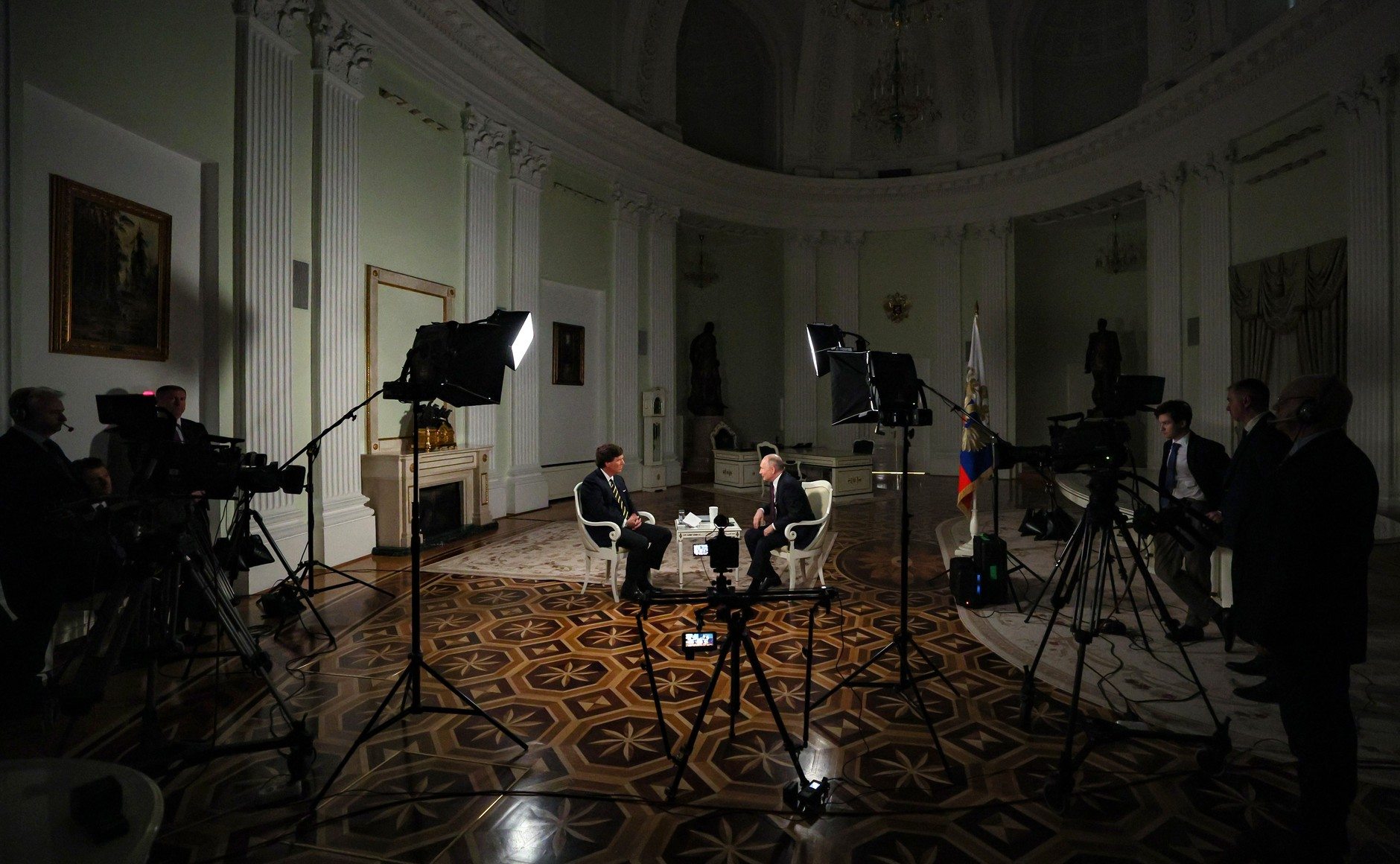
The filming scene during the interview

According to Izvestia, Carlson arrived in Moscow on February 3. His presence was reported upon by the Russian state media, which speculated that Carlson may have been in the country to interview Putin. Carlson appeared at the Bolshoi Theatre to attend a performance of the ballet Spartacus. According to Putin's press secretary, Dmitry Peskov, the interview occurred on February 6.

== Interview summary ==
Full interview

=== War in Ukraine ===
The interview began with Carlson asking Putin why he had ordered the invasion of Ukraine. Putin replied with a "history lecture" lasting around thirty minutes, giving his vision of the history of Eastern Europe from the founding of Kievan Rus' in the 9th century. He said that Poland "collaborated with Hitler" before it was invaded by Nazi Germany and the Soviet Union in 1939. He said that Poland provoked Nazi Germany to invade because the Poles "went too far" by refusing Hitler's demands for Polish territory. Putin justified the current invasion, in part, due to Ukraine's historical and ethnic relationship with Russia and Ukraine's alleged lack of cultural identity and territorial cohesion. He also called Ukraine "an artificial state, established by Stalin's will" and asserted that Ukraine's southern and eastern regions "had no historical connection" with it. He also blamed the war on Ukraine's alleged refusal to implement the Minsk II agreement.

Putin repeated some statements he made in his speech announcing the invasion: that the 2014 Ukrainian Revolution was a "CIA-backed coup d'état," that Ukraine started the Donbas war, that Ukraine's government has ties with neo-Nazis, and that NATO would threaten Russia through Ukraine.

When asked whether Russia had achieved its war aims, Putin replied: "No. We haven't achieved our aims yet because one of them is denazification." When Carlson asked whether Putin would "be satisfied" with the territory that Russia currently occupies, Putin avoided the question and referred to his previous answer. Putin indicated that he is ready to negotiate with the president of Ukraine, Volodymyr Zelenskyy, who had issued a decree prohibiting negotiations with Putin. Putin urged him to reverse that decision. Putin asserted that Ukraine and its allies would fail in inflicting a "strategic defeat" on Russia. He predicted that if the United States stopped supplying weaponry to Ukraine, the war would "be over within a few weeks" and suggested that the U.S. could signal it wanted to end the war by stopping the aid supply. However, Putin expressed no hope that the Russia–U.S. relationship would regenerate with a new American president following the 2024 elections since, in his view, it is about the mentality of the elites.

=== Russia–NATO relations ===
Putin conveyed to Carlson that Russia has no intention of attacking NATO members Poland or Latvia unless they attacked Russia.

Putin suggested that the U.S. federal government is secretly controlled by the Central Intelligence Agency (CIA) rather than its elected officials. He also portrayed Russia as a victim of Western betrayals and blamed the United States and the West for the 2022 Nord Stream pipeline sabotage and prolongation of the war, respectively.

At a point during the interview, he said that he had asked the former U.S. President Bill Clinton whether Russia could join the NATO alliance, but that after Clinton spoke with his advisors, he replied to Putin with a "no." Putin stated that he was not welcome there and that, despite "promises," NATO kept expanding eastwards, including to Ukraine, something he said Russia never accepted. He further said that Russia had archived a statement by the CIA admitting that it was supporting opposition groups to Russia in the Caucasus.

==== Imprisonment of Evan Gershkovich ====
At the end of the interview, Carlson asked whether Putin would release Evan Gershkovich, an American journalist detained in Russia on charges of espionage, into his custody as an act of goodwill. Putin suggested that he was willing to exchange Gershkovich for a Russian "patriot" who had "eliminated a bandit" in a European capital. This seemed to confirm that Russia was demanding a prisoner swap with Vadim Krasikov, a suspected Russian intelligence agent who assassinated a Chechen separatist in Berlin in 2019. Both men were later released in the 2024 Ankara prisoner exchange on August 1.

== Analysis ==
Various media outlets reported that Putin made many false claims and misleading statements during the interview and that Carlson failed to challenge him properly. They said that Carlson did not ask Putin about alleged Russian war crimes in Ukraine, ongoing Russian missile strikes on Ukrainian civilian targets, or Putin's repression of political dissent. Oliver Darcy of CNN wrote, "Carlson provided Putin a platform to spread his propaganda to a global audience with little to no scrutiny of his claims" and had "even fed into Putin's narratives" in some cases.

The website Polygraph.info, produced by Voice of America, contested several of Putin's allegations about the Russo-Ukrainian war. It rejected that the 2014 revolution was a "coup," saying that Ukraine's then-President Viktor Yanukovych was not overthrown by the military but instead "abandoned his post and fled to Russia amid mass protests." It also said, "Russia started the war on Ukraine in 2014" when it occupied Crimea and secretly sent military units to seize government buildings in Donbas.

The New York Times's Peter Baker compared the interview to the objections over monetary assistance to Ukraine in the Emergency National Security Supplemental Appropriations Act by some American Republican Party politicians. The former Financial Times editor Lionel Barber — who interviewed Putin in July 2019 — told Politico Magazine he believed that Putin leveraged Carlson's sympathy for Russia.

Historians who spoke to the BBC said that Putin's historical narrative was selective and misleading. Rejecting Putin's statement that Ukraine is "artificial," the historian Sergey Radchenko said: "Countries are created as a result of a historical process ... If Ukraine is a 'fake country,' then so is Russia." The historian Robert D. English said the interview "showed that it wasn't Russian insecurity, but Putin's personal imperialism, that motivated the war."

Professor Timothy Snyder of Yale University, a historian specializing in the history of Central and Eastern Europe, said: "[m]ost of what Putin says about the past is ludicrous." Snyder argues that Putin's "kind of story" brings war since, by Putin's standards, "no borders" of any state would be "legitimate" because anybody might claim foreign territory based on borders of arbitrarily chosen dates in the past. Snyder also says that Putin's "false distinction between natural nations and artificial nations" brings genocide because, in Putin's logic, "artificial" nations have no right to exist. In addition to war and genocide, Snyder analyzes fascism as the third "horror" justified by Putin's thoughts, stating that "Putin's war has been fought with fascist slogans and by fascist means."

== Reaction ==
In the first three days, the interview had 14 million views on YouTube and 185 million on Twitter.

When Carlson announced on February 6 that he would interview Putin, he erroneously stated that no journalist outside of Russia had "bothered to interview" Putin during the war. He also said: "Most Americans have no idea why Putin invaded Ukraine." Some American and European journalists disputed this and said that they had repeatedly been denied interviews with Putin and that some had been expelled or banned from Russia. They also noted that Putin's speeches had been widely covered in American media.

In a podcast conducted with Lex Fridman following the interview, Carlson described Putin's justification of "denazification" as "one of the dumbest things I'd ever heard" and likened Putin's conduct as akin to "an over-prepared student."

=== From American officials ===
The former U.S. Representative Adam Kinzinger referred to Carlson as a "traitor," while Representative Marjorie Taylor Greene praised Carlson's decision. The former U.S. Secretary of State Hillary Clinton and the former Congresswoman Liz Cheney described Carlson as a "useful idiot," a phrase that is frequently erroneously attributed to Vladimir Lenin, the first leader of the Soviet Union. On MSNBC, Clinton again criticized Carlson by stating that some individuals serve as a "fifth column" for Putin, alluding to Carlson.

Carlson was criticized further after the death of the Russian opposition leader Alexei Navalny in a Russian prison several days after the interview.

=== From Russian officials ===
Dmitry Medvedev, the deputy chairman of the Security Council of Russia and former Russian president, commented that Putin "told the Western world as thoroughly and in detail as possible why Ukraine did not exist, does not exist, and will not exist. Tucker Carlson did not get scared and did not give up."

=== Other reactions ===
Guy Verhofstadt, the prime minister of Belgium from 1999 to 2008, wrote that the European Union (EU) ought to consider issuing Carlson with a travel restriction should he amplify Putin's message. Peter Stano, a spokesperson for the High Representative of the Union for Foreign Affairs and Security Policy, Josep Borrell, stated that the EU was not considering sanctions against Carlson, despite rumors from Elon Musk and others.

Tsakhia Elbegdorj, the former president of Mongolia, posted on Twitter a map of the Mongol Empire, which included and encompassed all of Russia, saying: "After Putin's talk. I found Mongolian historic map. Don't worry. We are a peaceful and free nation."

The Russian opposition activist and journalist Yevgenia Albats said that hundreds of Russian journalists were compelled to flee Russia after the Russian invasion of Ukraine and to go into exile "to keep reporting about the Kremlin's war against Ukraine. The alternative was to go to jail. And now [Tucker Carlson] is teaching us about good journalism, shooting from the $1,000 Ritz suite in Moscow."

== See also ==
- February 2003 Saddam Hussein interview
- Mission to Moscow – 1943 propaganda film by Michael Curtiz
- The Putin Interviews – 2017 television programme
