= Paul Whelan =

American once detained in Russia (born 1970)

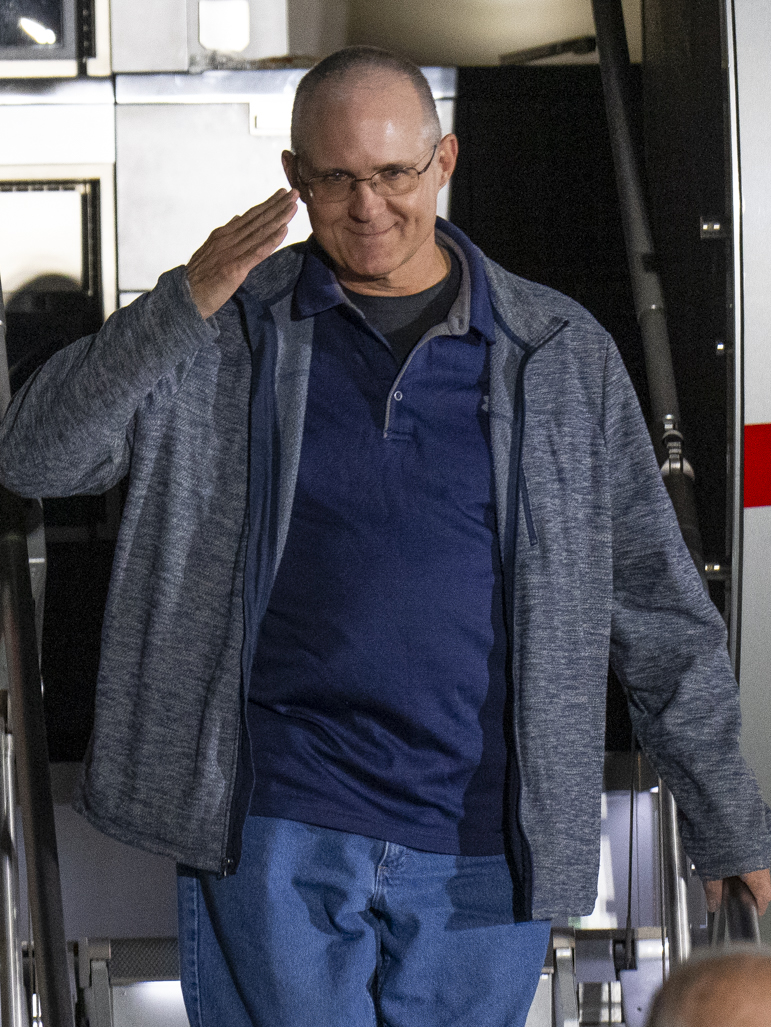
- Whelan in 2024
- Born: Paul Nicholas Whelan; March 5, 1970 (age 56); Ottawa, Ontario, Canada
- Citizenship: Canada; Ireland; United Kingdom; United States

Detainment
- Country: Russia
- Detained: December 28, 2018
- Conviction: Espionage
- Sentence: 16 years in prison
- Time held: 7 years, 7 months and 24 days
- Released: August 1, 2024
- Military career
- Allegiance: United States
- Branch: United States Marine Corps
- Service years: 1994–2008
- Rank: Corporal
- Conflicts: Iraq War

Paul Nicholas Whelan (born March 5, 1970) is a Canadian-born United States Marine veteran who was arrested in Russia on December 28, 2018, and accused of spying. On June 15, 2020, he received a 16-year prison sentence. He was released in a United States–Russia prisoner swap in Ankara, Turkey, on August 1, 2024.

Whelan holds U.S., British, Irish, and Canadian citizenship. Whelan was given a bad conduct discharge from the United States Marine Corps in 2008 after being convicted on multiple counts "related to larceny".

== Early life ==
Whelan was born on March 5, 1970, in Ottawa, Ontario, Canada, to British parents with Irish heritage. He was raised partly in the Ann Arbor area of Michigan where he and his twin brother David graduated from Huron High School in 1988. In addition to his twin brother, Paul Whelan has a brother, Andrew, and a sister, Elizabeth. He said in a deposition in 2013 that he holds a bachelor's degree in criminal justice and an MBA degree. He took courses at Northern Michigan University from fall 1988 to fall 1990 without earning a degree.

== Career ==
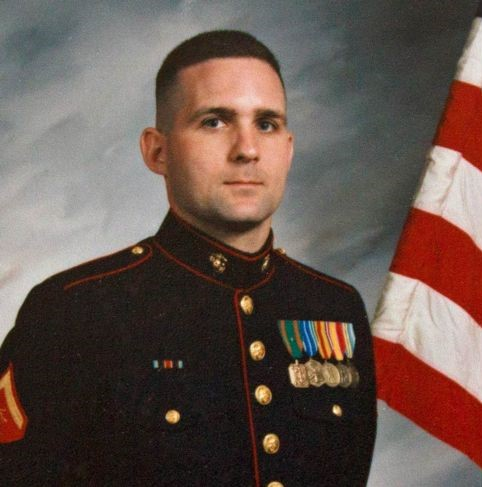
Whelan in the United States Marine Corps

According to Whelan, he entered the law enforcement profession in 1988, the same year he graduated high school. He stayed in this profession through the 1990s, as a police officer in Chelsea, Michigan, and a sheriff's deputy in Washtenaw County. However, the Chelsea Police Department said Whelan worked in lesser roles and as a part-time officer from 1990 to 1996, while the Washtenaw County sheriff reported no record of his employment. A former colleague said he was a patrol officer from 1998 to 2000 in the Keego Harbor Police Department. During this period, in 1994, Whelan enlisted in the Marine Corps Reserve.

He became an IT manager for the Kelly Services staffing company from 2001 to 2003, and then 2008 to 2010. From 2010 to 2016, Whelan was promoted to Kelly Services' senior manager of global security and operations.

He took military leave from Kelly Services to serve with the Marine Corps Reserve from 2003 to 2008, including service in Iraq. He held the rank of staff sergeant with Marine Air Control Group 38, working as an administrative clerk and administrative chief, and was part of Operation Iraqi Freedom. After a court-martial conviction in January 2008 on multiple counts "related to larceny", he was sentenced to 60 days restriction, reduction to pay grade E-4, and a bad conduct discharge. The specific charges against him included "attempted larceny, three specifications of dereliction of duty, making a false official statement, wrongfully using another's social security number, and ten specifications of making and uttering (Note: The word "uttering" is a legal term that refers to the crime of "unlawfully passing a forged document with intent to defraud".) checks without having sufficient funds in his account for payment."

When arrested in Russia, Whelan was director of global security and investigations for BorgWarner, an international automotive parts manufacturer based in Michigan. His work with Kelly Services and BorgWarner gave Whelan contacts with the U.S. intelligence community, federal agents and foreign embassies.

Whelan traveled to Russia several times from 2006 and maintained an intermittent presence on a Russian-language social media website, VKontakte (VK), where he had approximately 70 contacts. He has studied Russian but communicated online using Google Translate. Whelan supported Donald Trump in the 2016 U.S. presidential election; following Trump's victory, he posted in Russian Президент Трyмп Вперед!! ("President Trump Onward!!"). (Note: In this posting, he misspelled the President's name in Russian. The proper Russian spelling for Trump is Трамп.)

== Arrest in Russia ==
On December 28, 2018, Whelan was arrested in the Moscow area by Russia's Federal Security Service (FSB), which later confirmed his arrest. Whelan's twin brother David said Whelan arrived in Moscow on December 22 to attend the wedding of a fellow former Marine at the Hotel Metropol Moscow and to assist the groom's family members on their first visit to Russia, a country he had visited many times. He said his brother planned to return to Michigan on January 6, 2019, via Saint Petersburg. David said his brother entered Russia using his U.S. passport and had not been in contact with his family.

The BBC cited family members of Whelan, who said Whelan had previously bragged about knowing an agent of the FSB, and was privy to an unusual number of personal details about his friend, including which intelligence training school he attended. Whelan said the man was one of his oldest friends in Russia and that he had visited this man's house the winter before his arrest. Whelan also said he loaned his friend 80,000 Russian rubles ($1,147; £930), and claimed it was for the wedding. The FSB later said that the payment was for intelligence. (Note: Unlike the BBC, one Russian-language report said authorities confiscated $80,000 from Whelan rather than 80,000 rubles worth about a thousand US dollars. In support of 80,000 rubles as accurate, Whelan's brother David stated: "Paul had gotten some money out to pay for the wedding caterer, since the groom, Paul's Marine friend, had not realized he'd have to pay cash for the restaurant.")

According to Whelan, his long-time friend framed him by appearing unexpectedly in the hotel, followed by authorities, who later arrested him. According to attorneys for Whelan, they could not provide the name of Whelan's Russian friend due to Russian secrecy rules, but Whelan's family identified the person as Ilya Yatsenko, whom the Russian newspaper Kommersant described as a major in the FSB's Department "K", which monitors Russian economic crimes.

=== Criminal charges ===
Whelan was formally charged on January 3, 2019. According to the Russian news agency Rosbalt, Whelan was apprehended in his hotel room at the Metropol Hotel while concluding a long outing with a Russian citizen, who handed him a USB flash drive containing "a list of all the employees at a classified security agency". The independent Latvian-based publication Meduza reported that the wedding attendees all banded close together for the duration of the holiday, and were taken aback by Whelan's decision to spend the day alone.

Whelan was held for trial in Moscow's Lefortovo Prison, (Note: Though he has been described as being held in "solitary confinement", the prison's program for new prisoners is more complex than simple isolation and changes after the first ten days.) where as of March 2019, he shared a cell with a prisoner who spoke no English.

Former CIA officers have stated that the CIA would not recruit an officer with Whelan's military record, nor leave an officer exposed without a diplomatic passport. They further claim that Whelan's arrest is connected to tensions between Russia and the United States, including the detention of confessed unregistered foreign agent Maria Butina. On December 20, 2018, when discussing Butina's arrest, Russian President Vladimir Putin stated that Russia "will not arrest innocent people simply to exchange them".

U.S. Ambassador to Russia Jon Huntsman Jr. met with Whelan on January 2, 2019, while Whelan was in Russian custody. He told Whelan's family that Paul was "in good health and good spirits", but that the family needed to supply all his incidental needs aside from basic foodstuffs. (Note: "But even with food, we were told that we might want to give him extra money. He'll need to buy things like razors, toilet paper, soap, things that would be on-hand anywhere else.") U.S. Secretary of State Mike Pompeo said: "We've made clear to the Russians our expectation that we will learn more about the charges, come to understand what it is he's been accused of and if the detention is not appropriate, we will demand his immediate return." On January 4, 2019, British Foreign Secretary Jeremy Hunt said: "We don't agree with individuals being used in diplomatic chess games... We are all extremely worried about him and his family." As of January 4, British and Irish consular officials were seeking access to Whelan.

On January 3, 2019, Whelan's attorney, Vladimir Zherebenko, (Note: Zherebenko has worked on the high-profile international case of a Russian accused of drug trafficking.) said he was seeking his release on bail. He said a trial would not begin for at least six months, and that he would welcome an exchange of Whelan for Butina. He said: "I presume that he is innocent because, for now, I haven't seen any evidence against him that would prove otherwise." A few weeks later, Zherebenkov said Whelan had been unaware of the contents of the USB drive and believed it contained material solely of personal value such as "photographs, videos, anything at all, about his previous holiday in Russia."

On January 5, 2019, the Russian Foreign Ministry said that on the day after Whelan's arrest the United States had detained a Russian citizen, Dmitry Makarenko (born 1979), in the Northern Marianas and transported him to Florida to face charges of unauthorized export of defense equipment. (Note: Florida resident Vladimir Nevidomy pleaded guilty in June 2018 to conspiracy with Makarenko and was sentenced to 26 months in prison. In 2013, Nevidomy, who is a Ukraine-born naturalized United States citizen and was 32 years old at the time of sentencing, attempted to export ammunition primers, night vision rifle scopes, and thermal monoculars to Russia. In the summer of 2013, Dmitry Rogozin, Konstantin Nikolaev, Alexander Tarasov, who is a representative of the Cyclone Institute and the son of Viktor Tarasov who is the owner of the Cyclone Institute, and Alexey Beseda, who is the son of Sergey Beseda, supported Russia's interests in attempting to obtain items for military uses with night vision and thermal optic devices. In April 2013, Dmitry Ustinov, who was then 47 years old, was arrested in Lithuania for violating United States export laws by attempting to purchase night-vision equipment through eBay.)

=== Conviction and sentencing ===
On June 15, 2020, Whelan was convicted and sentenced to 16 years in a Russian prison for espionage by a court in Moscow. His lawyers said they believed Russia would now seek a prisoner swap. Whelan said in court that the case was a sham to use him to influence the United States: "We have proven my innocence... we have proven fabrication. This is slimy, greasy corrupt Russian politics, nothing more, nothing less."

Whelan was initially held at the Correctional Colony No. 18 under supervision of the Russian Federation's Federal Penitentiary Service. As of December 2020 he was held in a high-security prison, IK-17, eight hours drive southeast of Moscow.

=== Campaign for release ===
Family members said Whelan had been told that he had been arrested to be exchanged for a Russian prisoner in the United States, mentioning Konstantin Yaroshenko (who was released in return for American Trevor Reed), Viktor Bout, or Roman Seleznev. On July 27, 2022, it was announced that President Joe Biden had offered a trade for Whelan and WNBA player Brittney Griner, who was arrested in Russia in February on drug charges, in exchange for convicted arms dealer Viktor Bout, nicknamed "The Merchant of Death". The Russian side insisted on the additional release of Vadim Krasikov, an assassin serving a life sentence for murder in Germany. The Russian position was that Whelan was an agent and so required an exchange of comparable value such as Krasikov. Griner and Bout were, according to Russia's view, just considered criminals and so were of lesser value. After negotiations, only Griner was exchanged for Bout on December 8, 2022, as the Kremlin had refused to release Whelan and posed an ultimatum to the Biden administration of freeing Griner or no one.

Whelan's brother David Whelan approved of the decision to "make the deal that was possible, rather than waiting for one that wasn't going to happen."

On May 4, 2023, U.S. Ambassador to Russia Lynne Tracy visited Whelan in the remote Russian penal colony where he was being held. On August 16, 2023, Secretary of State Antony Blinken spoke with Whelan on the phone and told him to "keep the faith and we're doing everything we can to bring you home as soon as possible." On November 28, 2023, David Whelan discussed in an email to supporters that Paul had stated he was assaulted during his time at the camp; he was punched in the face by another inmate while working at a sewing table. Whelan's glasses were broken during the assault, which David speculated may have been motivated by "anti-American sentiment [which] is not uncommon among other prisoners."

According to an inmate, Whelan received a lot of mail in prison, including a letter reportedly from Julian Assange.

=== Release ===
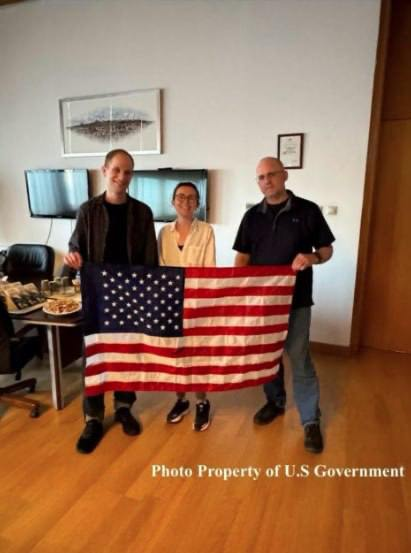
The first photo of Americans Evan Gershkovich, Alsu Kurmasheva, and Paul Whelan on August 1, 2024.

Whelan's attorney reported losing contact with Whelan in late July 2024.

On August 1, 2024, Whelan was released as part of a prisoner exchange at Ankara Esenboğa Airport. David Whelan issued a statement thanking the press for persisting in covering his brother's story during the 2,043 days of his captivity. He asked his brother be allowed some privacy and declared his role as a spokesperson ended. The Whelan twins' sister Elizabeth appeared alongside President Joe Biden in the Oval Office that day and spoke to Paul Whelan as he and others released prepared to leave Ankara. Greeting Paul Whelan on the tarmac at Joint Base Andrews, Biden removed the American flag pin from his lapel and pinned it on Whelan's jacket.

== Personal life ==
Whelan is a citizen of Canada, the United States, the United Kingdom, and Ireland. His twin brother David ascribed Paul's acquisition of the multiple nationalities to "probably a genealogical interest as much as anything." (Note: "My grandfather came from Ireland to England and my father came from England to Canada, and that's where we were born. So we were eligible for British and Canadian citizenship because we were born in Canada to British parents. And then, the Irish changed the law in the early part of the century to allow grandchildren of Irish citizens to get Irish citizenship. So he just thought it's an opportunity to have that, so why not?")

Whelan lived in Novi, Michigan, prior to detainment in Russia.

== See also ==
- Nicholas Daniloff
- Marc Fogel
- Russia–United States relations
- List of American people imprisoned in Russia
- Terry A. Anderson
