= Vadim Krasikov =

Russian FSB hitman (born 1965)

Vadim Nikolayevich Krasikov
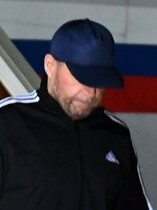
- Krasikov at Vnukovo International Airport, Moscow, following the 2024 Ankara prisoner exchange with the United States and NATO
- Native name: Вади́м Никола́евич Кра́сиков
- Born: 10 August 1965 (age 60); Keñestöbe, Kazakh SSR, Soviet Union
- Allegiance: Russian Federation
- Branch: Federal Security Service
- Service years: c. 2007–present
- Spouses: Tatyana Ivanovna Paramonova (m. 1989–2004) Ekaterina Aleksandrovna Lycheva (m. 2010)
- Children: 3

Vadim Nikolayevich Krasikov (Russian: Вади́м Никола́евич Кра́сиков [vɐˈdʲim nʲɪkɐˈlajɪvʲɪtɕ ˈkrasʲɪkəf]; born 10 August 1965) is a Russian hitman who was sentenced to life imprisonment in Germany for assassinating the Chechen separatist Zelimkhan Khangoshvili in the city of Berlin on 23 August 2019. His case was brought back to international attention during Russia–United States negotiations that culminated in the 2024 Ankara prisoner exchange between Russia and Belarus vis-à-vis NATO. One of the prisoners involved in the exchange for Krasikov, Ilya Yashin, would condemn the fact that he was specifically freed in exchange for him due to Krasikov originally being sentenced to life in prison for the murder of Khangoshvili.

Prior to Khangoshvili's death, Krasikov had been suspected of conducting several hits within Russia. His internal passport, which he received in 2015, shows that he is under Russian state protection, and he was widely believed to have been in close contact with the Federal Security Service (FSB) since at least 2007. A day after the 2024 prisoner exchange was completed, the Russian government's spokesman Dmitry Peskov confirmed Krasikov's affiliation with the FSB and stated that he had served as a bodyguard of Russian president Vladimir Putin as well.

== Role in Russian politics ==
=== FSB ties and suspected contract killings ===
Krasikov allegedly maintained close contact with veterans of the former FSB special forces group Vympel. According to Bellingcat, Evgeny Eroshkin (Note: Evgeny Eroshkin (Russian: Евгений Ерошкин; born 1963) works in the Eduard Bendersky owned Vympel Sodeystvie which is one of the many Bendersky owned Vympel-named private security companies. (Note: Eduard Vitalievich Bendersky (Russian: Эдуард Витальевич Бендерский; born 25 June 1970) acts as the de facto press secretary for FSB's Unit "V", supports unofficial connections between private security companies and the FSB's Center for Special Operations of the State Internal Intelligence Service, and is chairman of the Russian-Iraqi business council in February 2020 and February 2021. After graduating from the Airborne Forces School in Ryazan, he served in the military from 1991 to 1994 at the Vympel group training center and is a former officer of the FSB special forces unit Vympel. Beginning in 1997, he headed the Moscow based security company Vympel-A. From 2002 to 2008, he headed the Regional Public Organization of Vympel Special Forces Veterans. In 2007, he graduated from the Faculty of Law of the State University - Higher School of Economics (Russian: юридический факультет Государственного университета -Высшая школа экономики). Since 2008, he is the president of the Vympel-Fund charitable organization. He advises a deputy of the State Duma of the Russian Federation. Bendersky's son in law is Maxim Yakubets (Russian: Максим Якубец; born 1988 or 1989) that married Bendersky's daughter Alena Eduardovna Benderskaya (Russian: Алена Эдуардовна Бендерская) in 2017 and who allegedly is a Russian hacker and employee of Evil Corp who allegedly obtained over $100 million from banks, companies and individuals since 2011, supports both his own interests and the interests of the FSB, and is wanted by both British authorities and the FBI which is offering a $5 million reward for information about Maxim Yakubets. Benersky's wife is Zhanna Benderskaya (Russian: Жанна Бендерская). In 2015 and 2016, Bendersky may have liaised with the Director of FSB’s 2nd Service (Russian: 2-я служба ФСБ) Col. Gen. Alexei Semyonovich Sedov (Russian: Алексей Седов).)) is allegedly Krasikov's FSB handler. (Note: In the weeks before the assassination of Khangoshvili, Evgeny Eroshkin was also in contact with Roman Yuryevich Demyanchenko (Russian: Роман Юрьевич Демьянченко; born 4 December 1980) who is also known as both "Roman Davydov" and "Roman Nikolaev" and is a second suspect in Khangoshvili's murder.)

Previously, Krasikov was a suspect in two murders: in the 4 April 2007 murder by three people of the businessman and local politician Yuri Kozlov (Юрий Козлов) who was shot near his home in Kostomuksha, Republic of Karelia, while he was getting out of his car; and in the 19 June 2013 murder in Moscow of Albert Nazranov (Альберт Назранов) who was from Kabardino-Balkaria. After killing Kozlov, the criminals went to the river to throw away evidence and were spotted by witnesses. Recorded by CCTV, the murder of Nazranov was by an assailant who wore a cap and a black tracksuit and approached Nazranov by bicycle; however, upon seeing him, Nazranov pushed the assailant away and ran away, but was killed by the assailant with a pistol from close range with one shot to the chest and one to the head after the assailant caught up with Nazranov by bicycle. A few minutes later, the assailant fled the scene by bicycle. In 2014, Krasikov was arrested by Russian authorities on suspicion of the Nazarov murder and he along with both Vladimir Fomenko (Note: Vladimir Viktorovich Fomenko (Russian: Владимир Викторович Фоменко; born in 1976) is a retired veteran of the FSB special forcess group Vympel.) and Oleg Ivanov (Note: In 2003, Oleg Vladimirovich Ivanov (Russian: Олег Владимирович Иванов; born in 1976) lived at Balashikha, where the FSB Special Operations Center (TsSN FSB, military unit 35690) is based, and, in 2015, obtained an FSB veteran's ID.) also were arrested by Russian authorities on suspicion of the Kozlov murder. None of them were known to be convicted of any offence.

==== Passport and identity ====
On 3 September 2015, Krasikov received an internal Russian passport with the name Vadim Andreevich Sokolov (Вадим Андреевич Соколов) and Sokolov's entry in the Russian federal passport database accessible to law enforcement denotes that Sokolov is under state protection which is similar to the notes in the database for suspected GRU officers "Boshirov" and "Petrov" who allegedly were involved in the poisoning of Sergei and Yulia Skripal.

=== Killing of Zelimkhan Khangoshvili (2019) ===
After stalking (Note: Although both Georgian and German authorities were aware of assassination attempts on Khangoshvili, German authorities, who were monitoring Khangoshvili, ceased their surveillance of Khangoshvili one week before the murder.) and shooting Khangoshvili in Kleiner Tiergarten Park, Krasikov threw his bicycle, pistol, and a bag containing his disguise into the Spree River. Witnesses called the police, who detained him. Then investigators found his fingerprints on some of the items retrieved by police divers. Krasikov denied the killing, saying that he was a tourist named Vadim A. Sokolov, the name on his Russian passport. His real identity was finally established using photographs that showed his distinctive tattoos. German prosecutors indicated that Krasikov worked for the Russian Federal Security Service, who gave him a false identity, a passport, and the resources for the assassination. (Note: Following the assassination, the Georgian ambassador in Berlin was replaced.)

=== Ankara prisoner exchange (2024) ===
On 8 February 2024, during Tucker Carlson's interview with Vladimir Putin, the Russian president referred to a "patriot" who "eliminated a bandit" in a European capital city when Carlson questioned him on whether he would consider releasing the American journalist Evan Gershkovich, who had been imprisoned in Russia on charges of espionage; this remark is widely believed to have referred to Krasikov, though Putin did not mention him by name and hinted to negotiations with the United States for a prisoner exchange. Later that year, in August, Krasikov was among those released by NATO countries as part of the 2024 Ankara prisoner exchange with Russia–Belarus, which released Gershkovich and 15 others.

On 2 August 2024, Dmitri Peskov confirmed Vadim Krasikov is a FSB special forces officer, had served in the Alpha Group as a bodyguard of Vladimir Putin, frequently visited the FSB Anti-Terrorist Directorate on Vernadsky Avenue in Moscow, and had trained at the FSB special forces base "Vympel" before he left Russia to assassinate Khangoshvili.

== Personal life ==
From 12 December 1989 until 27 January 2004, Krasikov was married to Tatyana Ivanovna (née Paramonova) Krasikova (Russian: Татьяна Ивановна Парамонова; born 1966, Tygda, Magdagachinsky District, Amur Oblast). They have two children: a son Maxim Vadimovich Krasikov (born 1985) and daughter Kristina Antanyan (née Krasikova, born 1988).

Krasikov married his second wife Ekaterina Aleksandrovna (née Lycheva) Krasikova (Russian: Екатерина Александровна Лычева; born 1985, Kharkiv, Ukrainian SSR) in 2010. (Note: Ekaterina Krasikova is a co-founder with a 50% ownership stake in OSTINA LLC whose CEO, Aleksandr Yaroslavovich Kuzmin (Russian: Александр Ярославович Кузьмин), previously worked for the private security company Vityaz-1 Group, which includes veterans of the Ministry of Internal Affairs special forces and the head of this company is listed as Hero of the Russian Federation Sergei Ivanovich Lysyuk (Russian: Сергей Иванович Лысюк) who had commanded the Vityaz special forces and also temporarily commanded the Vega unit.) (Note: Ukrainian authorities obtained vital information revealing Sokolov as Krasikov through investigations in Kharkiv which are associated with his wife.) They have a daughter born 2013.
