= Tygda =

Tygda Тыгда
- Selo
- Location within Amur Oblast Location within Russia
- Coordinates: 53°06′41″N 126°19′54″E
- Country: Russia
- Region: Amur Oblast
- District: Magdagachinsky District

Population (2010)
  - Total: 3,319
- Time zone: UTC+9:00 (YAKT)

Tygda (Russian: Тыгда) is a rural locality (a selo) in Magdagachinsky District, Amur Oblast, Russia. The population is 3,319 as of 2010.

== Historical population ==
1959	1970	1979	1989	2010
5692	5360	5263	4694	3319
