= Kleiner Tiergarten =

Park in Berlin

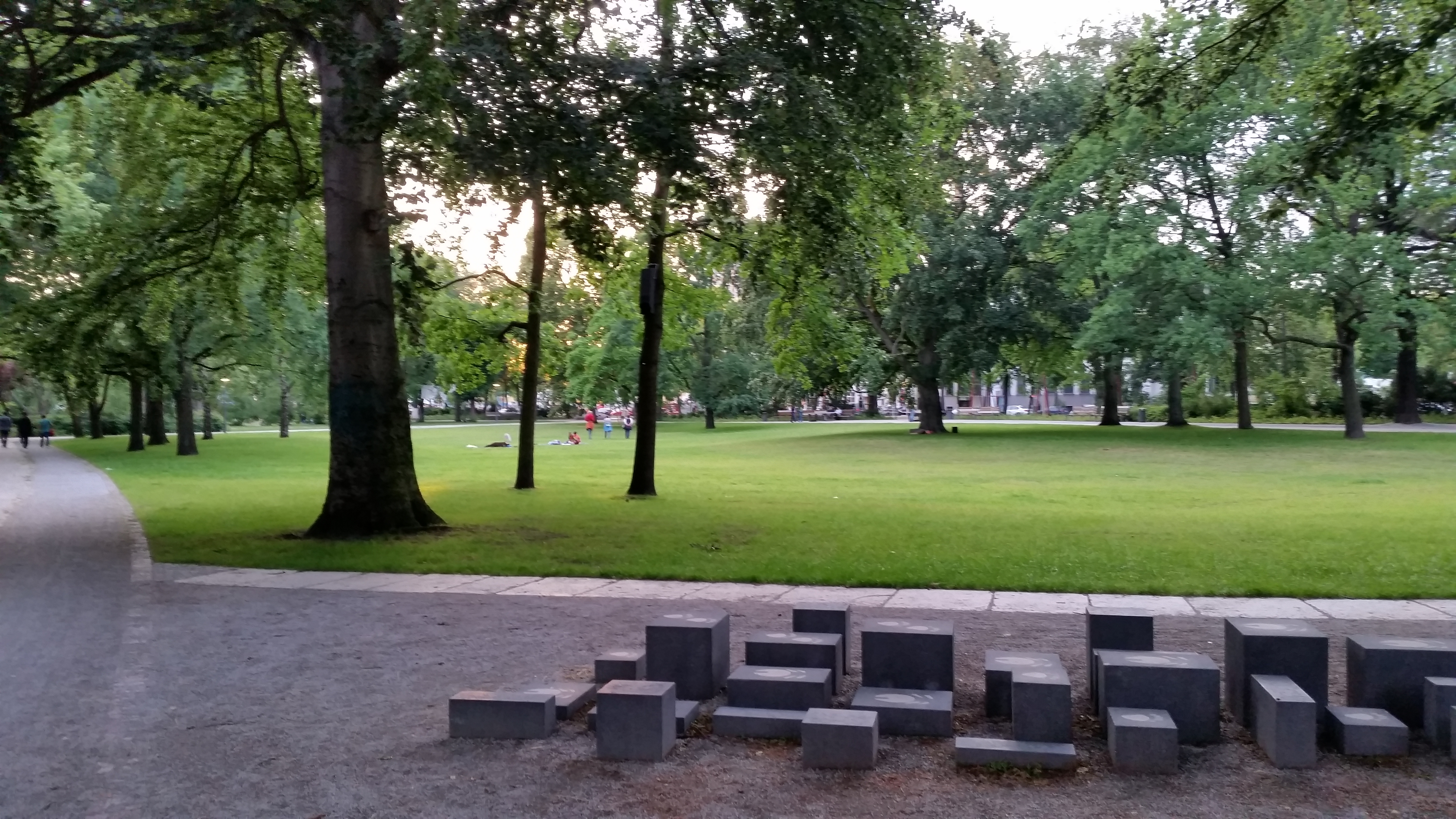
- Interactive map of Kleiner Tiergarten
- Type: Urban park
- Location: Moabit, Berlin
- Coordinates: 52°31′32″N 13°20′46″E
- Area: 7 hectares (17 acres)
- Created: 1655
- Open: Open year-round

Kleiner Tiergarten ("Small Tiergarten") is a park in Moabit, Berlin, Germany.

== Location ==
The park is located in Moabit, a division of Mitte, the central borough of Berlin. It is bounded to the north by Turmstraße, Alt-Moabit to the south, Ottostraße to the west, and Wilsnacker Straße to the east. Stromstraße and Thusnelda-Allee pass through the park from north to south, as does line U9 of the Berlin U-Bahn; the subway station Turmstraße is also located adjacent to the park.

== History ==
The park was once part of a much larger communally administered forest area called Jungfernheide. Frederick William, Elector of Brandenburg annexed it as a counterpart to the much larger Großer Tiergarten as the city of Berlin grew and usurped the former hunting grounds. Since 1655, the park has been referred to as the Kleiner Tiergarten. In the year 1790, the park was replanted; further redesign took place in 1835 in connection with the newly built St. John's Church (Berlin) designed by Karl Friedrich Schinkel. After the city of Berlin took over the administration of the area in 1876, landscape architect and horticultural director Johann Heinrich Gustav Meyer redesigned the park to contain benches, lanterns, and a spring. The Heilandskirche was constructed from 1892 to 1894, designed by Friedrich Schulze facing Thusnelda-Allee.

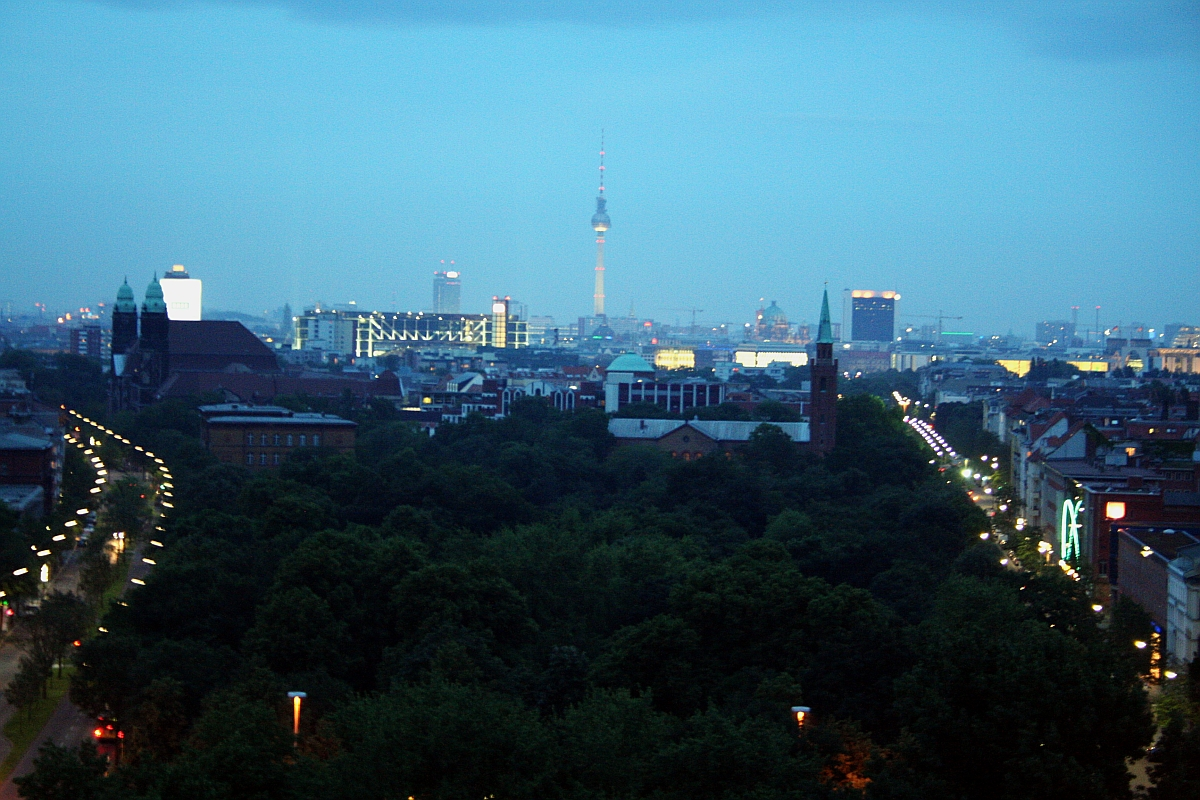
Kleiner Tiergarten as seen from above at dusk

The park was heavily damaged during World War II and was redesigned in 1960 by landscape architect Wilhelm Alverdes. Alverdes included the adjacent Ottopark in the plans and included a playground for children.

== Killing of Chechen commander ==
On 23 August 2019, former Chechen commander Zelimkhan Khangoshvili, who was a veteran of the Second Chechen War and had sought refuge in Germany in 2016, was shot and killed in Berlin. Khangoshvili had just left a local mosque where he regularly attended Friday prayers and was walking along a wooded path in Kleiner Tiergarten when a man rode up to him on a bicycle and shot him twice in the head with a silenced gun. The assassin was identified as 49 year-old Russian national Vadim Andreevich Krasikov by German police and was apprehended. On 15 December 2021, a Berlin court found Vadim Krasikov guilty of murder and sentenced him to life imprisonment without automatic parole. The court also determined that the murder was ordered by the Russian government as a "state-contracted killing".
