= Viktor Bout–Brittney Griner prisoner exchange =

2022 deal between Russia and the US

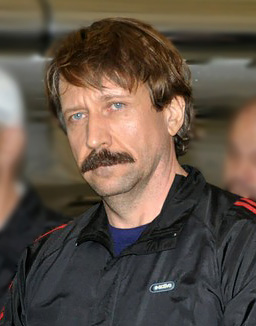
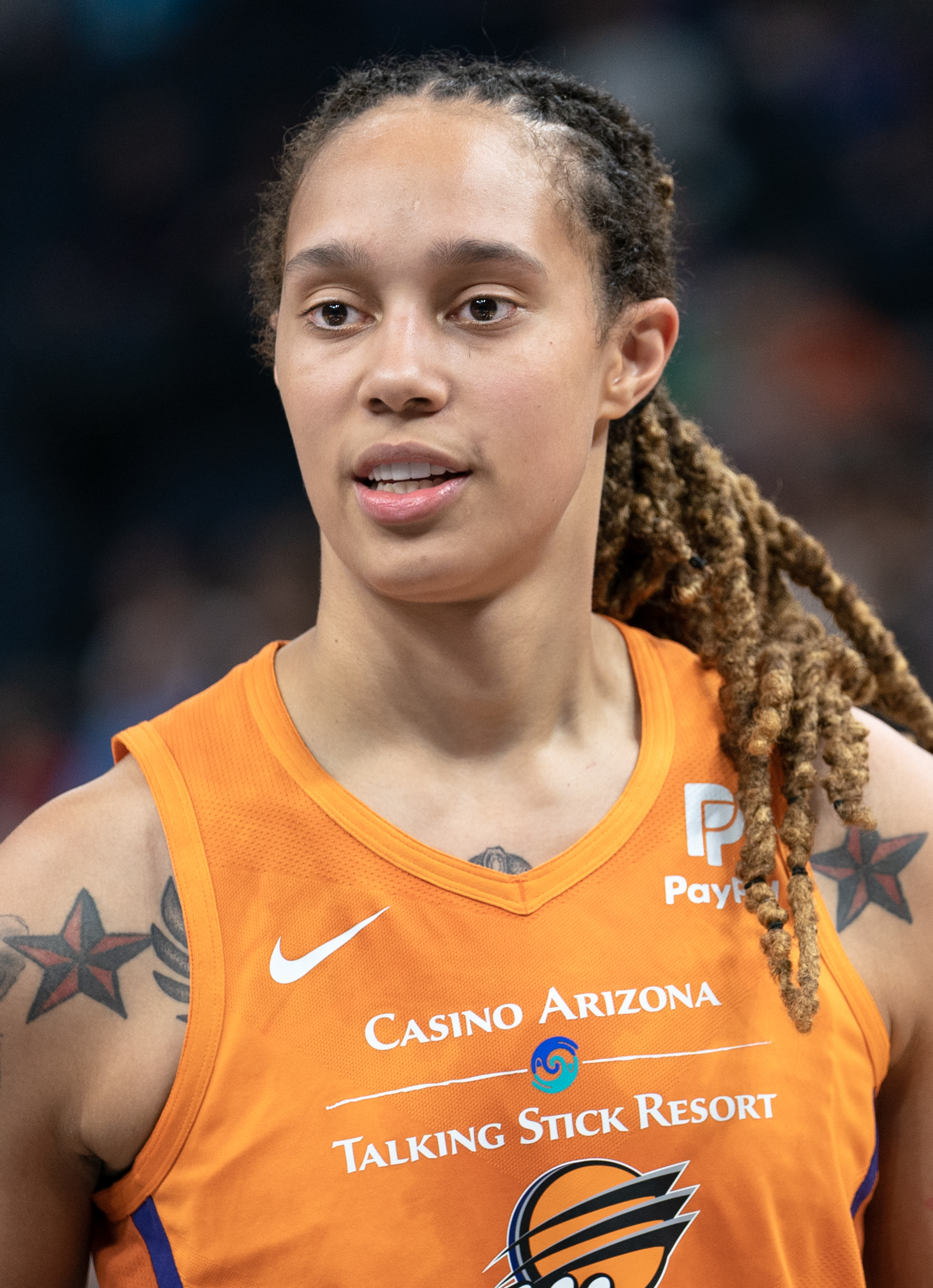
Viktor Bout and Brittney Griner

On December 8, 2022, Russia and the United States conducted a controversial 1-for-1 prisoner exchange, trading Brittney Griner, an American basketball player, for Viktor Bout, a Russian arms dealer. Griner, a WNBA champion, star, and Team USA Olympic athlete, had been convicted of smuggling and possession of cannabis in Russia in August 2022 and sentenced to nine years in prison. Bout had been arrested in Thailand in 2008 and transferred to the custody of the United States, where he was convicted of terrorism-related charges and sentenced to 25 years in prison in 2012. The exchange took place at Al Bateen Executive Airport in Abu Dhabi, United Arab Emirates, following months of negotiations.

The possible release of former U.S. Marine Paul Whelan, imprisoned in Russia on espionage charges in 2018, was also part of negotiations. Russia refused to release Whelan along with Griner as part of the prison exchange; U.S. President Joe Biden said that Russia was treating Whelan's case differently "for totally illegitimate reasons". The Russian position was that Whelan was an agent and so required an exchange of comparable value such as assassin Vadim Krasikov. Griner and Bout were just considered criminals and so were of lesser value in their view. Whelan would later be released by Russia through the massive 2024 Ankara prisoner exchange that would also release 25 other people from various nations.

Marc Fogel, another American detained in Russia for possessing 17 grams worth of marijuana, was also not included in the prisoner swap; Fogel would later be released on February 11, 2025 in exchange for cybercriminal Alexander Vinnik. However, Sarah Krivanek, an American detained for a domestic violence dispute, was deported from Russia on the same day as Griner's release.

== Background on Bout ==
In the years after the collapse of the Soviet Union in 1991, Bout became a notorious international arms dealer, selling Soviet-made weaponry in Africa (including Angola and Sierra Leone, as well as Liberia under Charles Taylor), in Asia (including to the Taliban), and in South America; his customers included warlords, rogue states, and insurgent groups in war zones. A 2002 Interpol warrant was issued against Bout by Belgium for money laundering. After it was issued, and amid international pressure increasing, Bout fled to Moscow, where he lived in safety and was protected by Russian authorities.

=== U.S. criminal charges, arrest in Thailand, and extradition to U.S. ===
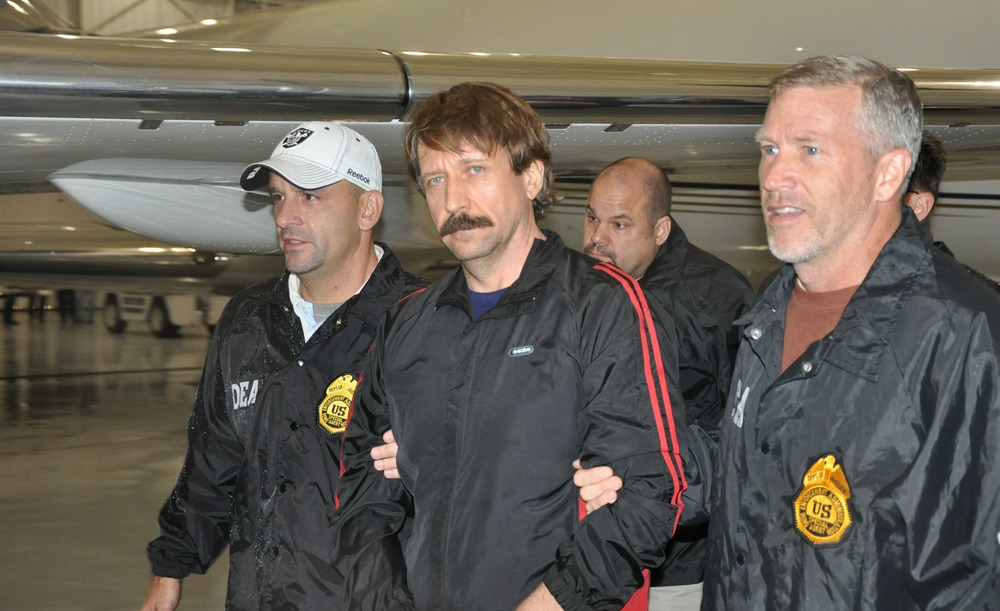
Viktor Bout in the custody of DEA agents on November 16, 2010, after being extradited to the United States

Bout was arrested in Bangkok, Thailand on March 6, 2008, after being the target of a U.S. Drug Enforcement Administration sting operation, in which U.S. agents, claiming to represent the Colombian rebel group FARC, negotiated with Bout for the supply of 100 9K38 Igla surface-to-air missiles and armor-piercing rocket launchers to be airdropped by Bout to agreed landing spots in Colombia. The imposters invited Bout to Thailand to meet their leader. U.S. prosecutors and law enforcement were aided by Andrew Smulian, a former South African intelligence agent and associate of Bout who acted as a go-between and became an informer against Bout.

After his arrest by Royal Thai Police in March 2008, based on an Interpol red notice requested by the U.S., Bout and the Russian government fought against Bout's extradition to the United States, but the Thai courts ultimately ruled (in 2010) that he could be extradited to face trial in U.S. federal court. On November 16, 2010, Bout was extradited from Thailand to the United States amid protests by the Russian government, who deemed it illegal.

=== U.S. prosecution and conviction ===
Bout's arrest in Thailand in March 2008 was based on a U.S. Department of Justice criminal complaint filed by prosecutors in Manhattan federal court, which was unsealed the day after his arrest. In May 2008, Bout was indicted on four federal terrorism-related charges: conspiracy to kill U.S. nationals; conspiracy to kill U.S. officers and employees; conspiracy to acquire and use anti-aircraft missiles; and conspiracy to provide material support or resources to a designated foreign terrorist organization. Additional charges against him were filed in February 2010. These included illegal purchase of aircraft, wire fraud, and money laundering.

On November 2, 2011, after a three-week jury trial in the United States District Court for the Southern District of New York, a federal court in Manhattan, Bout was convicted on all charges. On April 5, 2012, Bout was sentenced to 25 years in prison, the minimum sentence for conspiring to sell weapons to a U.S.-designated foreign terrorist group. US District Court Judge Shira Scheindlin ruled that the minimum sentence was appropriate because "there was no evidence that Bout would have committed the crimes for which he was convicted had it not been for the sting operation".

Russia's Ministry of Foreign Affairs issued a statement denouncing Bout's sentence as "a political order". During the trial, Bout's lawyers implied that he was a political prisoner. Bout's wife Alla said shortly afterwards that the judge conducted the trial in a proper way. Bout claimed that if the same standards were applied to everyone, all American gun shop owners "who are sending arms and ending up killing Americans" would be in prison.

=== Sentencing and imprisonment ===
In September 2013, the U.S. Court of Appeals for the Second Circuit upheld Bout's conviction. The court rejected Bout's contention that he had been the victim of a vindictive prosecution and that there was no legitimate law enforcement reason to prosecute him. In 2014, Bout hired the law firm of former U.S. Attorney General John Ashcroft to represent him, seeking a new trial based on claimed "newly discovered evidence"; the courts rejected Bout's claim, finding it meritless.

Prior to the 2022 prisoner swap, Bout had been scheduled for release in August 2029.

== Background on Griner ==
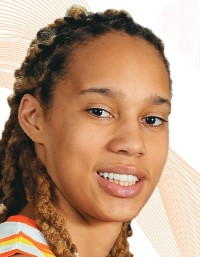
Brittney Griner in 2015.

Brittney Griner is an American professional and Olympic basketball player. Beginning in 2014, she played basketball during the WNBA offseasons for Russian team UMMC Ekaterinburg. On February 17, 2022, Griner was detained at Sheremetyevo International Airport after the Russian Federal Customs Service found she was carrying vaporizer cartridges containing less than a gram of hash oil; in Arizona she had been prescribed medicinal cannabis which is illegal in Russia. Some U.S. officials expressed concern that Russia was possibly using her as leverage in response to the international sanctions imposed against Russia for its invasion of Ukraine in February of that year. Former Pentagon official Evelyn Farkas expressed concern that Griner could be used as a "high-profile hostage" by Russia. Houston, Texas, Democratic Congresswoman Sheila Jackson Lee called for Griner's release.

In an interview with CNN, California Democratic Congressman John Garamendi estimated that it would be "very difficult" to get Griner out of Russia. He stated that although there might be negotiations to have her released, they would be stymied by the fact that diplomatic relations between Russia and the United States were strained because of invasion of Ukraine. In March 2022, Russian state news agency TASS reported that a Moscow court had extended the period of Griner's detention while under investigation until May 19, with an official from the Russian Public Monitoring Commission stating that "the only objective problem has turned out to be the basketball player's height. The beds in the cell are clearly intended for a person of lesser height". On March 23, the United States Department of State stated that an American diplomatic official had been able to visit Griner in detention, reporting that she was "in good condition".

In early May 2022, the U.S. State Department stated that they had determined Griner was being "wrongfully detained", indicating a more aggressive approach towards securing her release. On May 13, CNN reported that the Russian court had extended her pre-trial detention to June 18, 2022. Griner's Russian attorney Alexander Boykov told the Associated Press he believed the relatively short extension of the detention indicated the case would come to trial soon. On May 15, it was reported that the United States and Russia would consider a prisoner swap, with Russia exchanging Griner for Bout, who had served 10 years of a 25-year federal prison sentence in the United States for illegal arms dealing. In May 2022, in Griner's first public interview since she had been detained, Griner's wife Cherelle spoke to Good Morning America and called Griner a "political pawn". Cherelle stated she had heard from Secretary of State Antony Blinken and said, "I was grateful for the call. You say she's top priority, but I wanna see it".

=== Russian prosecution and conviction ===
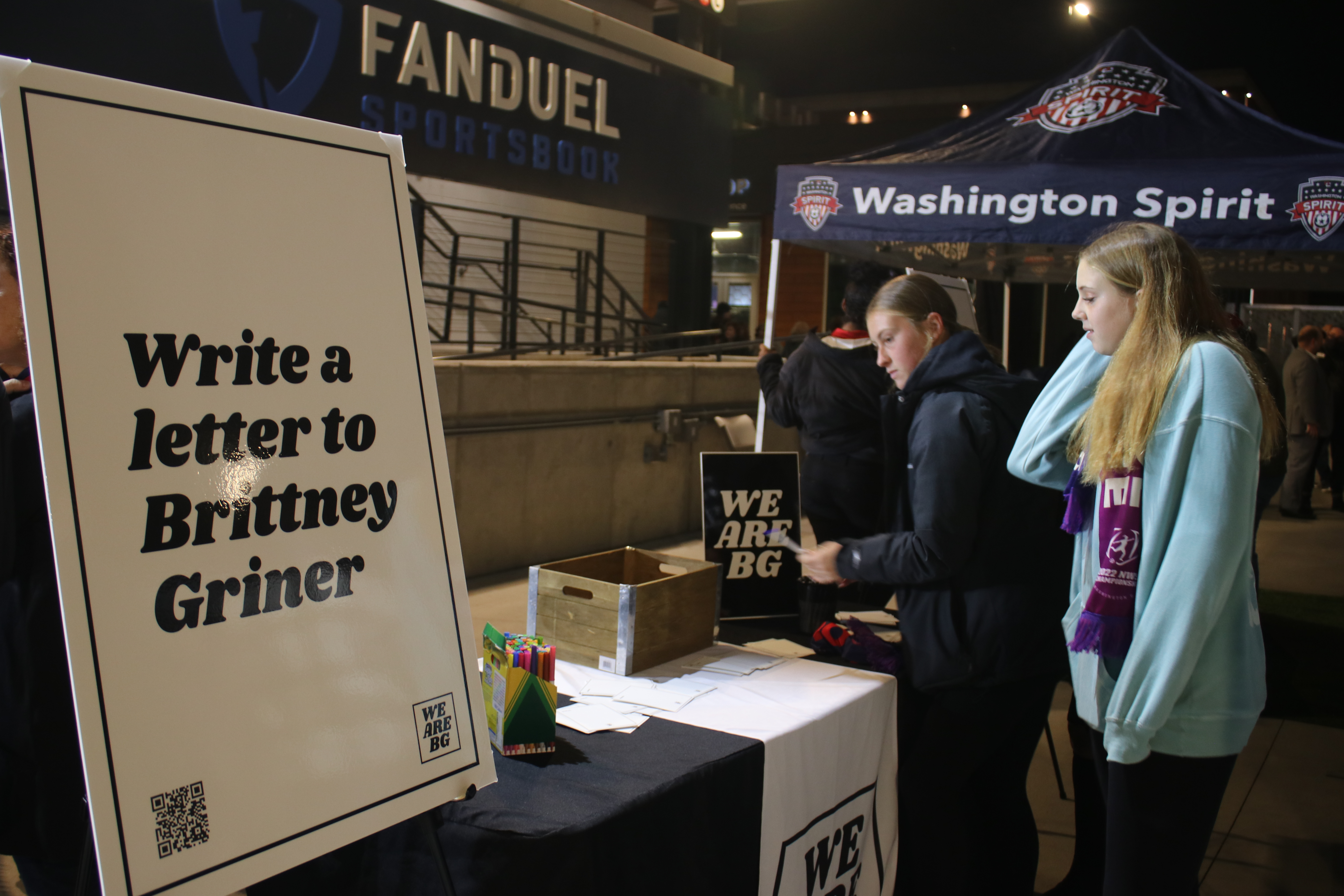
Fans at the 2022 NWSL Championship were invited to write letters to Griner.

In a closed-door hearing on June 27, a court in Khimki scheduled Griner's trial to begin on July 1 and extended her detention by six months pending the outcome of her case, according to her attorney, Alexander Boykov. She was photographed by the Associated Press and Agence France-Presse arriving at the hearing. On the second day of her trial, July 7, Griner pled guilty (Note: Under Russian law, Griner's guilty plea was only an admission of guilt, and it did not end her trial; the court still had to prove that there was sufficient evidence she committed the crime.) and then said, "But there was no intent. I didn't want to break the law". Griner requested that she be allowed to give testimony to the court as soon as she had sufficient time to prepare.

=== Sentencing and imprisonment ===
On August 4, the court found Griner guilty and sentenced her to nine years in prison, which would have made her release occur in 2031. They additionally fined her 1 million rubles (US$16,301). On November 17, Griner's lawyers said that she had been transferred to IK-2, a female penal colony in the town of Yavas in the region of Mordovia; previously she was held in an undisclosed location.

== Discussion of Paul Whelan and Marc Fogel ==
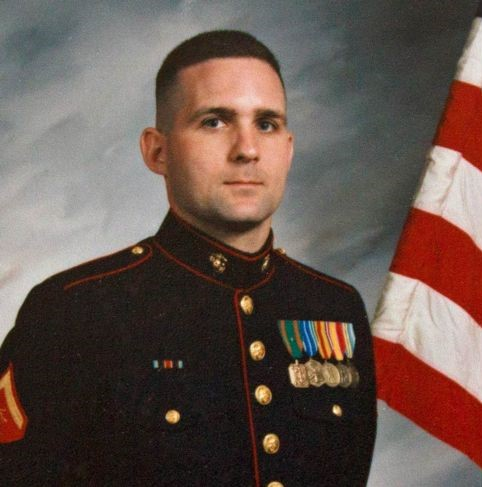
Former U.S. Marine Paul Whelan was later released in a different exchange

Other individuals whose names were brought up in connection with a potential prisoner exchange included Paul Whelan and Marc Fogel.

Paul Whelan was arrested in 2018 for espionage in Moscow, and sentenced to 16 years in prison. Family members said Whelan had initially been told that he had been arrested to be exchanged for a Russian prisoner in the United States, mentioning Konstantin Yaroshenko (who was later released in return for American Trevor Reed), Viktor Bout, or Roman Seleznev. On July 27, 2022, it was announced that President Joe Biden had authorized a trade for Whelan and Griner in exchange for Bout.

Marc Fogel was arrested at a Moscow airport in August 2021, after authorities discovered 17 grams of cannabis in his luggage. Fogel had been working as a history teacher at a Moscow school, and was sentenced to 14 years in prison at a Russian hard labor camp.

After negotiations, only Griner was exchanged for Bout on December 8, 2022. Biden stated that "for totally illegitimate reasons, Russia is treating Paul's case differently than Brittney's". Whelan said that he was "greatly disappointed that more has not been done to secure my release". Speaking to CNN by phone from the remote Russian penal colony where he is being held, he added that while he was pleased that Griner had been freed, "I don't understand why I'm still sitting here". The Russian position was that Whelan was an agent and so required an exchange of comparable value such as assassin Vadim Krasikov. Griner and Bout were just considered criminals and so were of lesser value in their view. Whelan was later released in the 2024 Ankara prisoner exchange involving 26 total individuals alongside him, while Fogel was later released on February 11, 2025 under returning president Donald Trump in a prisoner exchange involving Russian cybercriminal Alexander Vinnik.

== Prisoner exchange ==
=== Negotiations ===
In May 2022, a Forbes article claimed the Biden administration had offered Bout in exchange for the release of Brittney Griner. In June 2020, a Reuters article highlighted that following the charging of U.S. Marine Corps veteran Paul Whelan, Moscow was exploring the possibility of a prisoner swap exchanging Whelan for Bout and a pilot named Konstantin Yaroshenko. Yaroshenko was released in exchange for U.S. Marine Corps veteran Trevor Reed in April 2022.

In July 2022, the proposal got further support from President Joe Biden. On July 27, 2022, Biden approved a possible trade for Griner and Whelan in exchange for Bout. The possibility of an exchange was further complicated when the Russians demanded the inclusion of convicted assassin Vadim Krasikov, who is serving a life term for an assassination in Germany, in the negotiations.

Also in July 2022, U.S. Secretary of State Antony Blinken called his Russian counterpart Sergey Lavrov for the first time since the start of Russia's 2022 invasion of Ukraine, to whom he made an offer from the U.S. to secure the release of Griner and Whelan. According to the Tagesschau, it was unlikely that Krasikov would be transferred back to Russia. On July 27, Blinken said that the United States had made a "substantial offer" to Russia to release Griner and Whelan, but declined to say what the United States was offering. On the same day, CNN reported that the U.S. had offered to exchange Bout for both Griner and Whelan.

=== Release ===
Bout was released back to Russia on December 8, 2022, after spending a total of fourteen years and nine months in custody, including 3,823 days at the United States Penitentiary, Marion in the southern Illinois city of Marion, Illinois. Once confirmation came that the prisoner exchange excluded Whelan, President Biden said, "While we have not yet succeeded in securing Paul's release, we have not given up; we will not give up". Another American detained in Russia, Marc Fogel, was also not released in the swap. Though, Fogel was later released on February 11, 2025 in exchange for Russian cyber criminal Alexander Vinnik.

Sarah Krivanek, an American detained for a domestic violence dispute, had received attention from People magazine, and was deported from Russia on the same day of Griner's release, after the U.S. Embassy had loaned her the money for her plane ticket.

The BBC and Khaleej Times reported that Saudi Crown Prince Mohammed bin Salman and United Arab Emirates President Mohamed bin Zayed Al Nahyan had claimed to have "played a leading role in mediation efforts", but that "the White House denied any mediation had been involved". The exchange itself occurred at Al Bateen Executive Airport in Abu Dhabi, with Russian media playing video of the swap showing the prisoners passing within a few feet of each other during the exchange. In an interview with Maria Butina shortly thereafter, Bout said that he spoke to Griner, wishing her luck, and that he felt that she was "positively inclined" towards him in their brief encounter.

Following the exchange, Griner was flown to San Antonio, Texas, for an evaluation of her health at Brooke Army Medical Center.

== Reactions ==
Republicans criticized the prisoner exchange. Donald Trump called the swap for Griner "stupid" and an "unpatriotic embarrassment for the USA". Michael McCaul, the Republican ranking member of the United States House Committee on Foreign Affairs, said that the trade would "only embolden Vladimir Putin to continue his evil practice of taking innocent Americans hostage for use as political pawns".

Historian David Silbey stated "There's that underlying sense that this is part of the Democrats' focusing on someone who is sympathetic to them and leaving a Marine behind," despite Russia's refusal to include Paul Whelan in the exchange. He further stated "It fits nicely in the narrative that a lot of the right is telling America, about who gets the privilege in Biden's America". Whelan's family stated that they supported the exchange.

Some critical comments made reference to Griner's homosexuality, gender non-conformity, and past views on support for U.S. national anthem protests. Dani Gilbert, a hostage-taking-and-recovery expert and a Rosenwald Fellow in US Foreign Policy and International Security at the Dartmouth College John Sloan Dickey Center for International Understanding, characterized these critics as expressing the viewpoint, "If you hate the United States so much, how does it feel now?" Gilbert cited the perspective of some critics that Griner may have been less deserving of assistance than other prisoners held in Russia as contributing to some of the opposition to resolving Griner's case. Gilbert characterized certain reactions as being examples of the missing white woman syndrome.

In Griner's first regular season game back with the Phoenix Mercury on May 19, 2023, she was welcomed back to the WNBA with a standing ovation under the rivaling Los Angeles Sparks' Crypto.com Arena. The at the time Vice President of the United States, Kamala Harris, made a pre-game speech to the Mercury before the game began; she was also one of the notable attendants of the game that held a crowd of 10,396 people alongside former Los Angeles Lakers players Magic Johnson and Pau Gasol, then-current Lakers head coach Darvin Ham, and former tennis star Billie Jean King. In Griner's first home game back two days later, she was welcomed to a greater standing ovation at the Mercury's Footprint Center under a season-high crowd of 14,040 people, with new team owner Mat Ishbia commenting on the experience later that day. Both games were nationally aired on ESPN and ESPN+ at the time, with both games resulting in the WNBA gaining nearly double the viewing experience from their previous opening weekend. After stating that she would not return to international play unless it were for the Olympic Games, Griner would return to play for Team U.S.A. in the 2024 Summer Olympics held in Paris, France alongside Mercury teammates Diana Taurasi and Kahleah Copper amidst controversy on her inclusion to the team over rookie player Caitlin Clark. Griner and Team U.S.A. would eventually win the gold medal over the hosts in France after a tense 67–66 finale, with Griner being emotional after the U.S. national anthem was played following the medal ceremony after the gold medal game.

== See also ==
- 2024 Ankara prisoner exchange
- Taliban Five–Bowe Bergdahl prisoner exchange
- Hostage diplomacy
