= Evan Gershkovich =

American journalist (born 1991)

- Evan Gershkovich in 2024
- Born: October 26, 1991 (age 35); Princeton, New Jersey, U.S.
- Education: Bowdoin College (BA)
- Occupations: Journalist; reporter
- Employer: The Wall Street Journal

Detention
- Country: Russia
- Detained: March 29, 2023
- Charge: Espionage
- Released: August 1, 2024
- Sentence: 16 years imprisonment
- Time held: 1 year, 4 months and 3 days

Evan Gershkovich (born October 26, 1991) is an American journalist and reporter at The Wall Street Journal covering Russia.

Gershkovich graduated from Bowdoin College, majoring in philosophy and English and writing in student newspapers. He moved to Russia in 2016, contributing to multiple media outlets, and has been with The Wall Street Journal since 2022.

He was detained by Russia's Federal Security Service on charges of espionage in March 2023, marking the first time a journalist working for an American outlet had been arrested on charges of spying in Russia since the Cold War. The White House and media advocacy groups condemned the arrest. On July 19, 2024, Gershkovich was sentenced to 16 years in prison after being convicted in an espionage trial. He was released on August 1, 2024, as part of a prisoner exchange.

US officials have speculated that the motivation behind the order for Gershkovich's arrest was an anticipated prisoner exchange for one or more high-profile Russians imprisoned in other countries. Gershkovich, who remained in the country following the Russian invasion of Ukraine, was named one of the 100 most influential people in the world by Time magazine after his arrest in 2023.

== Early life and education ==
Gershkovich's parents, Ella and Mikhail Gershkovich, are Jewish immigrants who each settled in the U.S. after leaving the Soviet Union via the U.S. Refugee Resettlement Program during a period of mass emigration, ending up in the United States in 1979 and eventually in New York City, where they met. The couple moved to Princeton, New Jersey, where Gershkovich and his sister grew up speaking Russian at home. Sources differ on how fluent Gershkovich is in Russian, with Gershkovich himself saying he learned most of his Russian in Moscow, an account bolstered by his colleague, The New Yorker Moscow correspondent Joshua Yaffa.

In 2010, Gershkovich graduated from Princeton High School, where he had captained the soccer team. At Bowdoin College, he majored in philosophy and English, wrote for The Bowdoin Orient and The Bowdoin Review, and disc jockeyed for WBOR, the campus radio station. He graduated in 2014.

== Career ==
Gershkovich worked for The New York Times from 2016 to 2017, The Moscow Times from 2017 to 2020, and Agence France-Presse from 2020 to 2022 before moving to The Wall Street Journal in January 2022. He had lived in Russia for six years prior to his arrest, at the time of which he was based at the Journal's bureau in Moscow and covering the Russo-Ukrainian War. He was working in Yekaterinburg when arrested, covering the Russian mercenary military organization Wagner.

== Arrest ==
On March 29, 2023, while Gershkovich was on assignment in Yekaterinburg, the counterintelligence department of the Federal Security Service (FSB) detained him for having information on a "Russian defence enterprise". Russian officials said he was collecting secrets on the "production and repair of military equipment" for the CIA.

According to U.S. officials, Gershkovich's driver dropped him off at a steakhouse at 4 p.m. and two hours later his phone was turned off. The Wall Street Journal hired a lawyer to find him at the FSB's headquarters but couldn't locate him. The Kremlin confirmed his arrest hours later. Dmitri Peskov, Russian president Vladimir Putin's press secretary, said that he was "caught red-handed" but would not provide further details. Russian Foreign Minister Sergey Lavrov said "we have irrefutable evidence that Gershkovich was engaged in espionage" during a visit to New York in July 2024.

Gershkovich was transferred to Moscow where he was detained by a district court until May 29. He was then taken to Lefortovo Prison, a holding facility used by the Soviet Union to detain Soviet dissidents. He was formally charged on April 7. He was accused of acting on behalf of foreign intelligence and attempting to collect classified information about Uralvagonzavod, the largest main battle tank manufacturer in the world, in Yekaterinburg. United States ambassador to Russia Lynne M. Tracy met with Gershkovich on April 17 and wrote that he is "in good health and remains strong".

Gershkovich's detention by Russia's Federal Security Service marked the first time a journalist working for an American news outlet has been arrested in Russia on charges of spying since the Cold War. According to NPR, a court, operating in closed session, ordered Gershkovich held until the end of May while investigations were ongoing. According to Kommersant, he was scheduled to be transferred to Lefortovo prison while awaiting trial. A conviction for espionage could carry a sentence of 20 years.

Gershkovich appealed his arrest on April 3. A judge denied his appeal and rejected an offer from The Wall Street Journal publisher Dow Jones & Company to post a bond of 50,000,000 ₽ (US$600,000). Gershkovich's lawyers Tatyana Nozhkina and Maria Korchagina said he was reading Leo Tolstoy's War and Peace (1869) and watching cooking shows on monastery cuisine. In a handwritten letter from April 5 obtained by The Wall Street Journal, Gershkovich said he was "not losing hope".

Gershkovich appeared in Moscow City Court on April 18 to appeal his pre-trial detention. A Moscow court extended his detention to August 30 on May 23, where Gershkovich's parents met him. The court rejected his legal team's offer to free him on bail of 50 million rubles ($614,000) or put him under house arrest. He appealed the extension on May 26; a Moscow court denied the appeal on June 22. Tracy met with Gershkovich on July 3.

== Trial ==
Gershkovich appeared in a court in Yekaterinburg on June 26 and July 18, 2024. On July 19, the court found him guilty of spying and espionage and sentenced him to 16 years in prison. In a subsequent interview, Andrei Mineyev, the judge who handled the case, said that the court did not look into material evidence, adding that neither the prosecution nor the defense had requested to consider them, and that the verdict did not take too long as he could "type quickly".

== Reactions ==
The Wall Street Journal "vehemently denied" the charges, and the arrest was criticized by the White House, the Committee to Protect Journalists, the Society of Professional Journalists and other media advocacy groups. Within days NATO and the European Union issued statements criticizing the arrest. On April 27, 2023, the Biden administration sanctioned Russia's Federal Security Service and Iran's Islamic Revolutionary Guard Corps intelligence organization, accusing them of wrongfully detaining Americans.

Secretary of State Antony Blinken spoke to his Russian counterpart, Sergey Lavrov, on April 2, 2023. He expressed "grave concern" over Gershkovich's arrest and called for the release of Paul Whelan, a former Marine accused of espionage in 2018. The Ministry of Foreign Affairs repeated the Kremlin's claim that Gershkovich committed "illegal activities". Russian ambassador to the United States Anatoly Antonov claimed that Under Secretary of State for Political Affairs Victoria Nuland threatened Russia with "retaliatory measures" unless Gershkovich was released.

On April 10, 2023, the US State Department officially designated Gershkovich as "wrongfully detained", which meant his case was handed to the office of the Special Envoy for Hostage Affairs. White House press secretary Karine Jean-Pierre called the arrest "unacceptable" and said, "We condemn the detention of Mr. Gershkovich in the strongest terms." She added that his release was a priority for President Biden. As he left for Mississippi to see the damage from tornadoes there, Biden told reporters: "Let him go." Vice President Kamala Harris, on a visit to Zambia, made the same call at an event with President Hakainde Hichilema.

The Wall Street Journal said it stood in solidarity with Gershkovich and his family. The editorial board of The New York Times—which employed Gershkovich from 2016 to 2017—expressed outrage at his detention and called for his immediate release. A coalition of leaders of dozens of media organizations condemned the arrest in a letter sent to Antonov, as did a separate statement from The New York Times, Bloomberg News, Politico, and The Washington Post.

Senate leaders Mitch McConnell and Chuck Schumer released a bipartisan statement condemning his arrest. The House of Representatives unanimously passed a resolution calling for the release of American prisoners in Russia on June 13.

Former Russia correspondent Alan Philps compared Gershkovich's arrest to Joseph Stalin's censorship of media in the Soviet Union. Conservative columnist Bret Stephens stated that Putin would benefit from reading Gershkovich's works to gain an independent assessment of the Russian invasion of Ukraine. Brittney Griner, who was arrested in Russia for carrying hashish oil before being involved in a prisoner exchange with arms dealer Viktor Bout, called for his release.

In an editorial "Press Freedom Is Your Freedom" WSJ Publisher Almar Latour described the campaign to free Gershkovich as a "global press freedom effort", a framing it kept throughout his detention. When Gershkovich was freed, the paper ran a full-page message: "Welcome Home, Evan. Freedom does not exist without a free press."

Critics later said the WSJ's position was undercut by how it treated another of its journalists, Selina Cheng, while Gershkovich was in prison. According to Cheng, her WSJ supervisor told her that "having its employees advocating for press freedom publicly would create a conflict" with employment at the WSJ and directed Cheng to withdraw from participation in the Hong Kong Journalists Association, a trade union that speaks out for press freedom in the city. Cheng did not withdraw, and was fired by the WSJ soon after taking up the leadership role at the Hong Kong Journalists Association. The firing was widely criticized by press freedom groups, human rights groups and journalists' unions. Several commentators contrasted the paper's support for Gershkovich with its treatment of Cheng, calling the decision "hypocritical". In response, the paper said: "The Wall Street Journal has been and continues to be a fierce and vocal advocate for press freedom in Hong Kong and around the world." In September 2026, a Hong Kong court convicted the WSJ's publisher of blocking Cheng from taking up her role at the Hong Kong Journalists Association.

Gershkovich was well known among independent Russian journalists, many of whom had worked with him, and his arrest drew a strong response from them. Russia's leading independent journalists published an open letter demanding his release. Mediazona offered live coverage of his arrest on their website. On YouTube, the exiled broadcaster Maksim Kurnikov warned that the arrest could mean less independent reporting from Russia on the war. In June 2024, Russian state media reported that his trial would be held behind closed doors in Yekaterinburg, starting on June 26. Gershkovich denied the charges. The trial resumed in July 2024, after he had spent nearly 16 months in detention. Washington dismissed the charges as fabricated, and a UN panel deemed his detention arbitrary.

== Analysis ==
The Carnegie Russia Eurasia Center's Tatiana Stanovaya said that Gershkovich's coverage of the war in Ukraine is likely what attracted authorities' attention. Reporters Without Borders' Jeanne Cavalier said the arrest appeared to be "a retaliation measure" that was "very alarm(ing) because it is probably a way to intimidate all Western journalists that are trying to investigate aspects of the war on the ground in Russia".

Former US ambassador in Russia John J. Sullivan said the arrest was likely a preliminary move in a desired prisoner exchange and that the fact Gershkovich had been charged with espionage rather than a lesser crime indicated the desired swap would likely be for a high-profile prisoner. Russian foreign minister Sergey Lavrov suggested that Gershkovich may be part of a prisoner swap. The Kremlin stated that Russia and the United States were in contact over a prisoner swap on July 3.

Former CIA Moscow station chief Daniel Hoffman agreed the timing of the arrest was "probably not a coincidence" and was likely ordered to gain leverage in a prisoner exchange. Hoffman noted the week before the arrest, the U.S. Department of Justice had indicted Sergey Cherkasov for espionage, asserting Cherkasov was a Russian spy enrolled at Johns Hopkins under the guise of being a student from Brazil. In March 2023, Cherkasov was imprisoned in Brazil for falsifying Brazilian documents, but the U.S. could seek to have him extradited in order to facilitate a prisoner swap. Cavalier also hypothesized Russia would use Gershkovich as a "bargaining chip" for Cherkasov.

Another potential exchange, hypothesized by Andrey Zakharov, would be Gershkovich and Paul Whelan for María Rosa Mayer Muños and Ludwig Gisch (aka Anna Dultseva and Artem Dultsev), who were arrested in Slovenia on charges of spying for Russia in January 2023. The Moscow Times affirmed that speculation centered on Cherkasov, Mayer, and Gisch. President Joe Biden told reporters that he was "serious" about a prisoner swap at a news conference in Helsinki, Finland. Gershkovich's parents told ABC News anchor George Stephanopoulos that Biden would "do whatever it takes" to release him.

== Release ==
On August 1, 2024, news reports stated that Gershkovich, alongside Paul Whelan, was released as part of a prisoner exchange in Turkey. His exchange would later be considered a part of a 26-person swap of prisoners, making for the largest prisoner exchange in post-Cold War history. After his release, Gershkovich attended Post Isolation Support Activities, a 10-day program offered by the Department of Defense to help former hostages acclimate back to regular life.

== Works ==
- Gershkovich, Evan (2026). This cursed beautiful land: a Russian-American story. New York, NY: Crown. ISBN 979-8-217-08726-6.

== See also ==
- Nicholas Daniloff, an American journalist arrested in Moscow in 1986
- Daniel Pearl, an American journalist for The Wall Street Journal, kidnapped and murdered by terrorists in Pakistan in 2002
- List of American people imprisoned in Russia
- Selina Cheng, fellow WSJ journalist and campaigner for press freedom
