= 2024 Ankara prisoner exchange =

International prisoner exchange

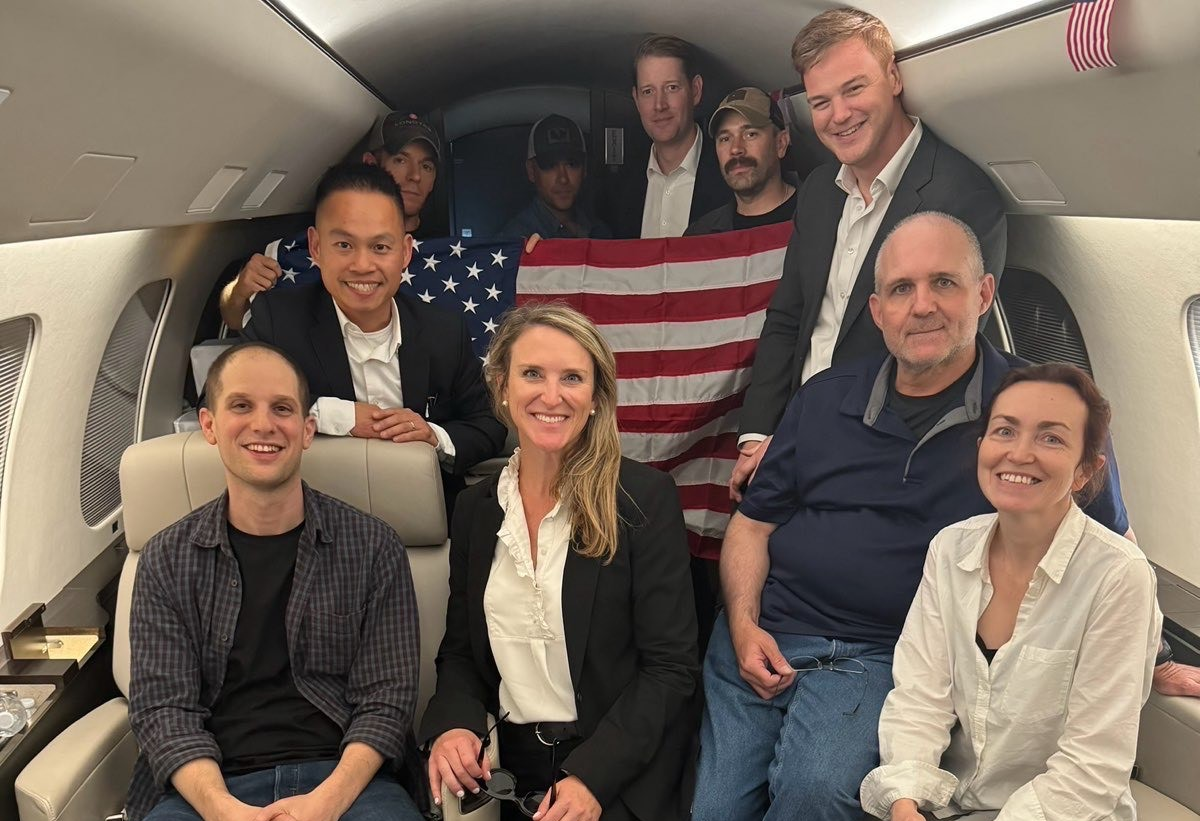
The three American nationals released in the exchange are joined by government officials and staff on their return flight to the United States: Evan Gershkovich (bottom-left), Paul Whelan (second from right), and Alsu Kurmasheva (bottom-right)

On 1 August 2024, the United States and Russia conducted the most extensive prisoner exchange since the end of the Cold War, involving the release of twenty-six people. The exchange was realized at the Ankara Esenboğa Airport in Turkey.

Following at least six months of secret multilateral negotiations, Russia and Belarus released sixteen detainees while the U.S., Germany, Poland, Slovenia, and Norway collectively released eight detainees and two minors. Among those released were three American citizens: Evan Gershkovich, a reporter for The Wall Street Journal, Alsu Kurmasheva, a journalist for Radio Free Europe/Radio Liberty, and Paul Whelan, a former U.S. Marine; Gershkovich and Whelan had each received sixteen-year sentences for espionage, becoming a cause célèbre in the U.S.

The prisoner exchange, which has been described as one of the most complex in history, took place at Ankara Esenboğa Airport in Turkey, whose government served as a mediator between the parties. Under the terms of the agreement, the eight Russian nationals and two minors were transferred to Russia, while thirteen of the prisoners held by Russia and Belarus were released to Germany and three to the U.S. Both the U.S. and Russia hailed the prisoner swap as a significant diplomatic victory.

== Background ==
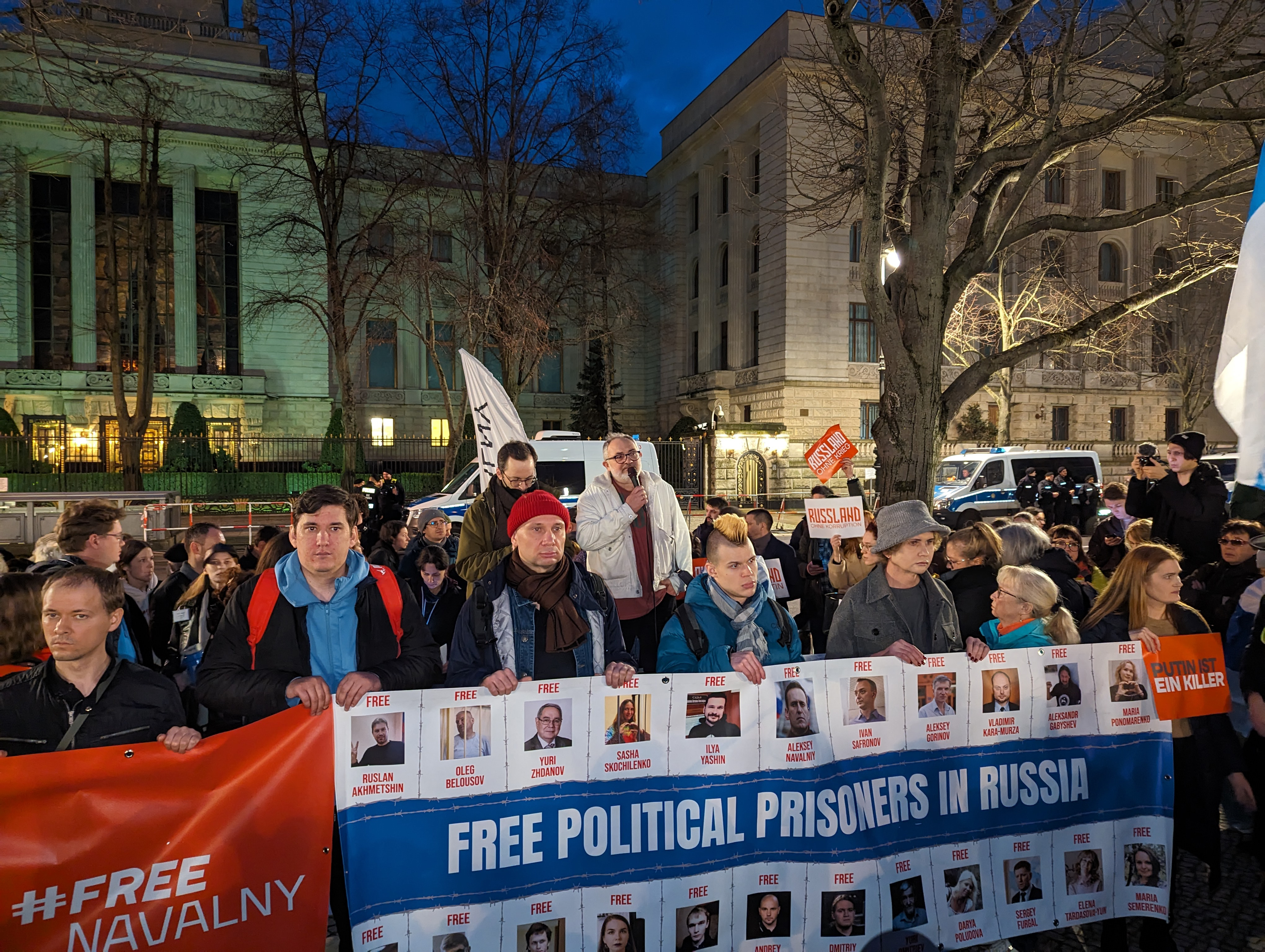
Protest outside the Russian Embassy in Berlin demanding the release of Russia's political prisoners, February 2024

During the Cold War, the U.S. and the Soviet Union routinely exchanged prisoners, who were typically spies, military officers, or other government agents. The end of the Cold War in 1991 resulted in a marked decline in espionage activities—and, accordingly, prisoner exchanges—between the U.S. and Soviet Union's successor, the Russian Federation; the most recent mass prisoner swap between the two countries occurred in 2010, when ten Russian sleeper agents detained in the U.S. as part of the so-called "Illegals Program" were exchanged for four prisoners held in Russia.

In response to rising geopolitical tensions with the West over the past decade, Russia has heightened its repression of both domestic dissent and perceived foreign influence, leading to the arrest and detention of U.S. citizens, many of whom are deemed by the U.S. government to have been "wrongfully detained". In 2012, Russia enacted a foreign agent law that has been used to persecute those deemed under foreign influence; the scope of the law was expanded in 2024. Following the start of the ongoing Russo-Ukrainian War in 2014, and especially since the full-scale Russian invasion of Ukraine in 2022, the Russian government has intensified its crackdowns on domestic opposition and "foreign influence". On 4 March 2022, Russian President Vladimir Putin signed into law a bill introducing prison sentences of up to 15 years for spreading "fake news" about Russia's military operation in Ukraine; thousands of Russians have been prosecuted under this law for criticizing the war in Ukraine, including opposition politician Ilya Yashin and artist Aleksandra Skochilenko.

Trevor Reed, a U.S. Marine veteran arrested in Russia in 2019 allegedly for attacking a police officer, was released in April 2022 for Konstantin Yaroshenko, a Russian pilot and aviation transport expert imprisoned in the U.S. for drug smuggling. Less than a year after Reed's release, American basketball player Brittney Griner, who had been arrested in February 2022 for drug smuggling, was exchanged the following December for convicted Russian arms dealer Viktor Bout. Several analysts and U.S. officials expressed concern that Russia used Reed and Griner as leverage in response to the international sanctions imposed upon it after their invasion of Ukraine. Several other Americans held by Russia, including former U.S. Marine Paul Whelan and schoolteacher Marc Fogel, had been contemplated as part of the exchange deal for Griner; the negotiations leading to her release reportedly paved the way for the most recent exchange of twenty-six individuals between both countries and their respective allies.

The involvement of Belarus in the deal reflects Putin's foreign policy, seeing post-Soviet states as Russia's sphere of influence and opposing NATO enlargement there. According to Western analysts, Belarus acts on the Kremlin's demand under the Russian-dominated supranational "Union State".

== Prisoner exchange ==
=== Negotiations and preparation ===
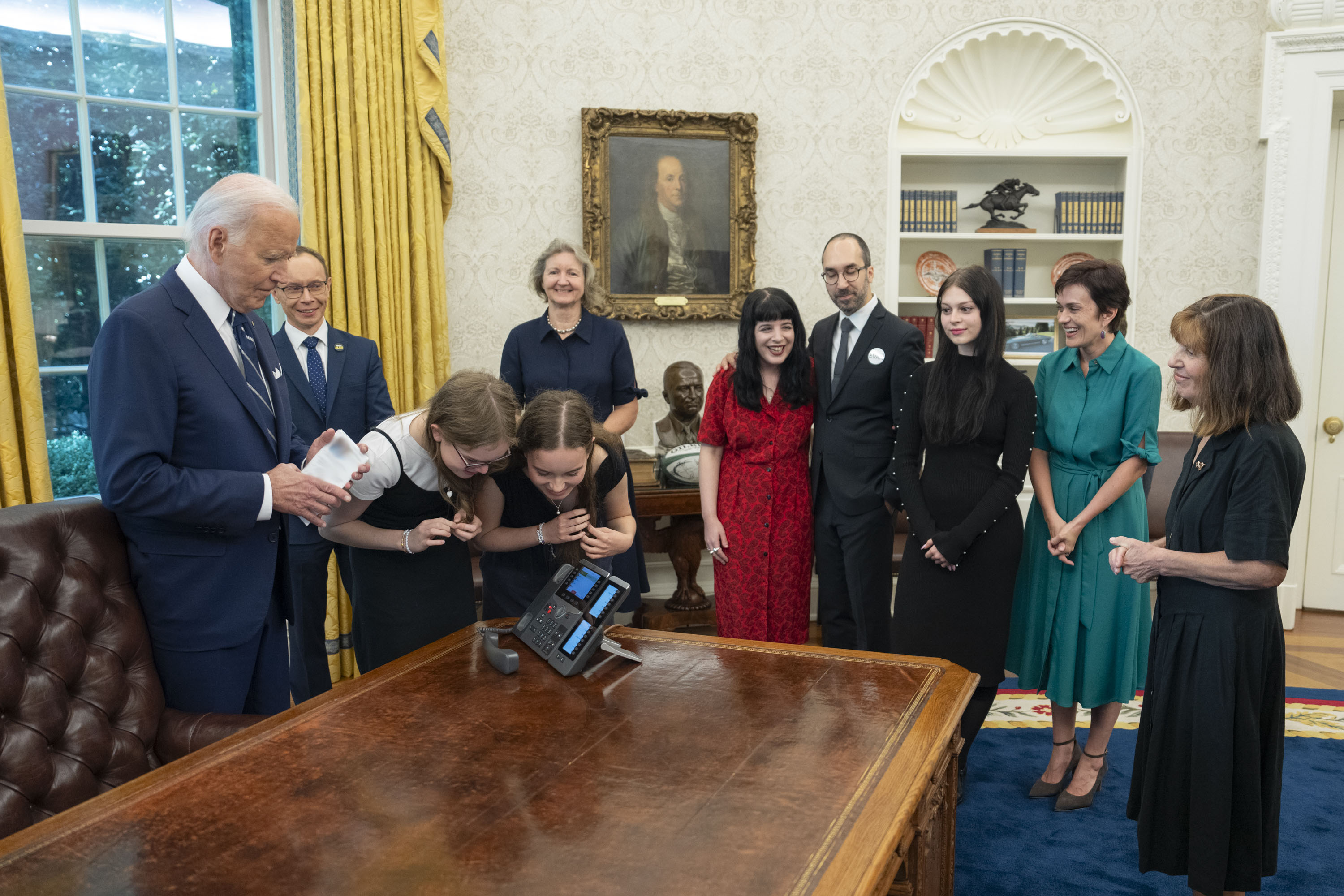
U.S. President Joe Biden and family members of the released Americans speaking with the prisoners by phone in the Oval Office, following the release of the Americans kept prisoner

During a February 2024 trip by German chancellor Olaf Scholz to Washington, D.C., the German and American governments began working on how to negotiate an agreement that would include the freeing of Russian opposition leader Alexei Navalny.

U.S. Vice President Kamala Harris met with Scholz and Slovenian prime minister Robert Golob separately during the Munich Security Conference in February 2024 to privately discuss the negotiations. After Navalny's death on the first day of the conference—explained by his allies as a killing to prevent the exchange—the proposal turned to focus on other prisoners.

Prior to June 2024, Sergey Beseda headed the Russian side of the negotiations that later led to the 2024 Ankara prisoner exchange; however, in June 2024, Vladimir Putin replaced Beseda with Aleksey Komkov. (Note: Alexey Komkov (Russian: Алексей Комков) was the head of the FSB Internal Security Directorate from September 2016 after the 8 July 2016 resignation of the former head of the FSB Internal Security Directorate Sergey Borisovich Korolev, which vacated the chair of Korolev in the CSS, because Korolev was promoted to the post of head of the Economic Security Service of the FSB of Russia. Alexey Komkov headed the FSB Internal Security Directorate until 2018 when he was transferred to the FSB Counterintelligence Service. Komkov is a protégé of Sergey Korolev) The Vice President of Germany's BND Philipp Wolff (Note: Philipp Wolff (born 1972, Gräfelfing) was the Vice President for Central Tasks (German: Vizepräsident für zentrale Aufgaben) of Germany's BND since 1 November 2022 when he replaced Michael Baumann after the BND restructured during 2022.) also joined the negotiations at this time.

On 21 July, American president Joe Biden called Slovenian prime minister Robert Golob to secure the necessary pardons for two Russian spies held in the country that were to be exchanged as part of the swap.

In the days leading up to the exchange, three Russians were transferred from facilities operated by the U.S. Bureau of Prisons to the United States Marshals Service.

Turkey served as a key mediator of the exchange and was named by President Biden as one of the nations that had "stepped up" to ensure that the prisoners were released; the Turkish government, which maintains relatively warm relations with both parties, oversaw the physical exchange of prisoners at Ankara Esenboğa Airport.

=== Individuals released ===
Twenty-six individuals, including two minors believed to be the children of the two Russian spies in Slovenia, were released. Marc Fogel and Ksenia Karelina were not included as part of the exchange. Individuals returning to Russia are from various countries: the United States, Germany, Slovenia, Poland, and Norway.

==== Released by Russia and Belarus ====
The following people were released by Russia and Belarus:

Prisoners previously held by Russia and Belarus
| Name | Nationality | Country detained in | Held since | Occupation | Charges | Prison sentence |
|---|---|---|---|---|---|---|
| Lilia Chanysheva | Russia | Russia | 2021 | Regional coordinator of Navalny Headquarters in Ufa | Extremism | 9.5 years |
| Ksenia Fadeeva | Russia | Russia | 2023 | Regional coordinator of Navalny Headquarters in Tomsk | Extremism | 9 years |
| Vadim Ostanin | Russia | Russia | 2021 | Regional coordinator of Navalny Headquarters in Barnaul | Extremism | 9 years |
| Evan Gershkovich | United States | Russia | 2023 | Reporter for The Wall Street Journal | Espionage | 16 years |
| Vladimir Kara-Murza | Russia; United Kingdom | Russia | 2022 | Opposition politician | Treason | 25 years |
| Rico Krieger | Germany | Belarus | 2024 | Red Cross employee | Terrorism | Death |
| Alsu Kurmasheva | Russia; United States | Russia | 2023 | Journalist for Radio Free Europe/Radio Liberty | Spreading false information about the Russian military | 6.5 years |
| Kevin Lik | Russia; Germany | Russia | 2023 | High school student | Treason | 4 years |
| Herman Moyzhes | Russia; Germany | Russia | 2024 | Immigration lawyer | Treason | Not brought to trial |
| Oleg Orlov | Russia | Russia | 2024 | Human rights activist | Discrediting the Russian military | 2.5 years |
| Andrei Pivovarov | Russia | Russia | 2021 | Head of Open Russia political organization | Carrying out activities of an undesirable organization | 4 years |
| Patrick Schöbel | Germany | Russia | 2024 | Technician, was a tourist in Russia | Drug smuggling (6 gummy bears coated with cannabis oil) | Not brought to trial |
| Aleksandra Skochilenko | Russia | Russia | 2022 | Artist and author | Spreading false information about the Russian military | 7 years |
| Demuri Voronin | Russia; Germany | Russia | 2021 | Political scientist | Treason | 13 years and 3 months |
| Paul Whelan | United States; Canada; Ireland; United Kingdom | Russia | 2018 | Security executive and former U.S. Marine | Espionage | 16 years |
| Ilya Yashin | Russia | Russia | 2022 | Opposition politician | Spreading false information about the Russian military | 8.5 years |

==== Russian citizens released by Western countries ====
The following people were released by Western countries:

Prisoners previously held by the West
| Name | Nationality | Country detained in | Held since | Occupation | Charges | Prison sentence |
|---|---|---|---|---|---|---|
| Artem Dultsev | Russia | Slovenia | 2022 | Undercover spies, SVR | Espionage | 19 months |
| Anna Dultseva | Russia | Slovenia | 2022 | Undercover spies, SVR | Espionage | 19 months |
| Pablo González Yagüe (a.k.a. Pavel Rubtsov) | Russia; Spain | Poland | 2022 | Journalist, suspected GRU officer | Espionage | Not sentenced |
| Vladislav Klyushin | Russia | United States | 2023 | Businessman | Fraud | 9 years |
| Vadim Konoshchenock | Russia | Estonia; United States | 2022 | Suspected FSB officer | Conspiracy to evade sanctions | Not sentenced |
| Vadim Krasikov | Russia | Germany | 2021 | FSB officer | Murder (of Zelimkhan Khangoshvili) | Life in prison |
| José Assis Giammaria (a.k.a. Mikhail Mikushin) | Russia; Brazil | Norway | 2022 | Researcher, suspected GRU officer | Espionage | Not brought to trial |
| Roman Seleznev | Russia | Maldives; United States | 2014 | Hacker | 38 charges related to hacking (Note: According to the U.S. Department of Justice, he was convicted on "[ten] counts of wire fraud, eight counts of intentional damage to a protected computer, nine counts of obtaining information from a protected computer, nine counts of possession of 15 or more unauthorized access devices and two counts of aggravated identity theft".) | 27 years |

== Responses ==
=== United States ===
U.S. president Joe Biden delivered remarks following the exchange

In the United States, Republican representative Michael McCaul, the chairman of the House Committee on Foreign Affairs, praised the exchange and claimed that Russian president Vladimir Putin had a "strategy of detaining individuals for negotiations".

Republican presidential nominee and former president Donald Trump called the exchange "a win for Putin" and said that it "sets a very bad precedent" for US. He also questioned if money was involved in the deal. His running mate, JD Vance, however, called the exchange "great news", and said that Trump deserved credit for it, claiming Putin was motivated to "clean house" by fear of a future Trump presidency.

News of the exchange was broken by Bloomberg prior to the plane's landing in Turkey; this was criticized by other outlets because information provided by the White House to journalists was embargoed until the individuals were successfully released.

After finishing a 2024 Summer Olympics match with Team U.S.A. winning 87–73 over Belgium, Olympiad basketball player and Phoenix Mercury center Brittney Griner, who had previously been in discussions with Paul Whelan for a joint release together before the Viktor Bout–Brittney Griner prisoner exchange came about, expressed great joy over hearing about the prisoner exchange, saying that she's "head over heels happy for the families right now. Any day that Americans come home, that's a win." She would also add that "although today is one of celebration, our hearts go out to the many Americans still being held hostage overseas, and their families. As we extend support to those who have returned and celebrate the collective hands that helped to make American families whole – we must continue to do everything we can to shine a light on the remaining Americans detained."

The family and supporters of Marc Fogel, a schoolteacher from Western Pennsylvania who has been in prison in Russia for three years for the same crime as Griner—bringing a small amount of medical marijuana into the country—objected to him being left out of the swap. Fogel was reportedly devastated by it. The US State Department has refused to designate Fogel as "wrongfully detained" as it did Griner before negotiating her release. Fogel was ultimately released months later on February 11, 2025, in exchange for Russian cyber criminal Alexander Vinnik.

=== Norway ===
Prime Minister Jonas Gahr Støre described the exchange as a difficult dilemma: "Normally, we want people who are arrested and suspected of crimes in our countries to be investigated and possibly brought to trial according to our principles of the rule of law. So, intervening in that is a very serious matter. But you have to make that assessment in a broader context. And that broader context indicated that it was the right thing to do."

Minister of Foreign Affairs Espen Barth Eide stated that the exchange was part of a larger goal where it is important for Norway to act as a good ally and to contribute where other countries have had great needs and Norway has been able to assist. He also commented on the case of Mikhail Mikushin, a suspected GRU agent imprisoned in Norway: "This [the exchange] is in practice the closest one gets to an official confirmation that he is a Russian intelligence officer and not a Brazilian researcher, as he has originally claimed to be.

=== Russia ===
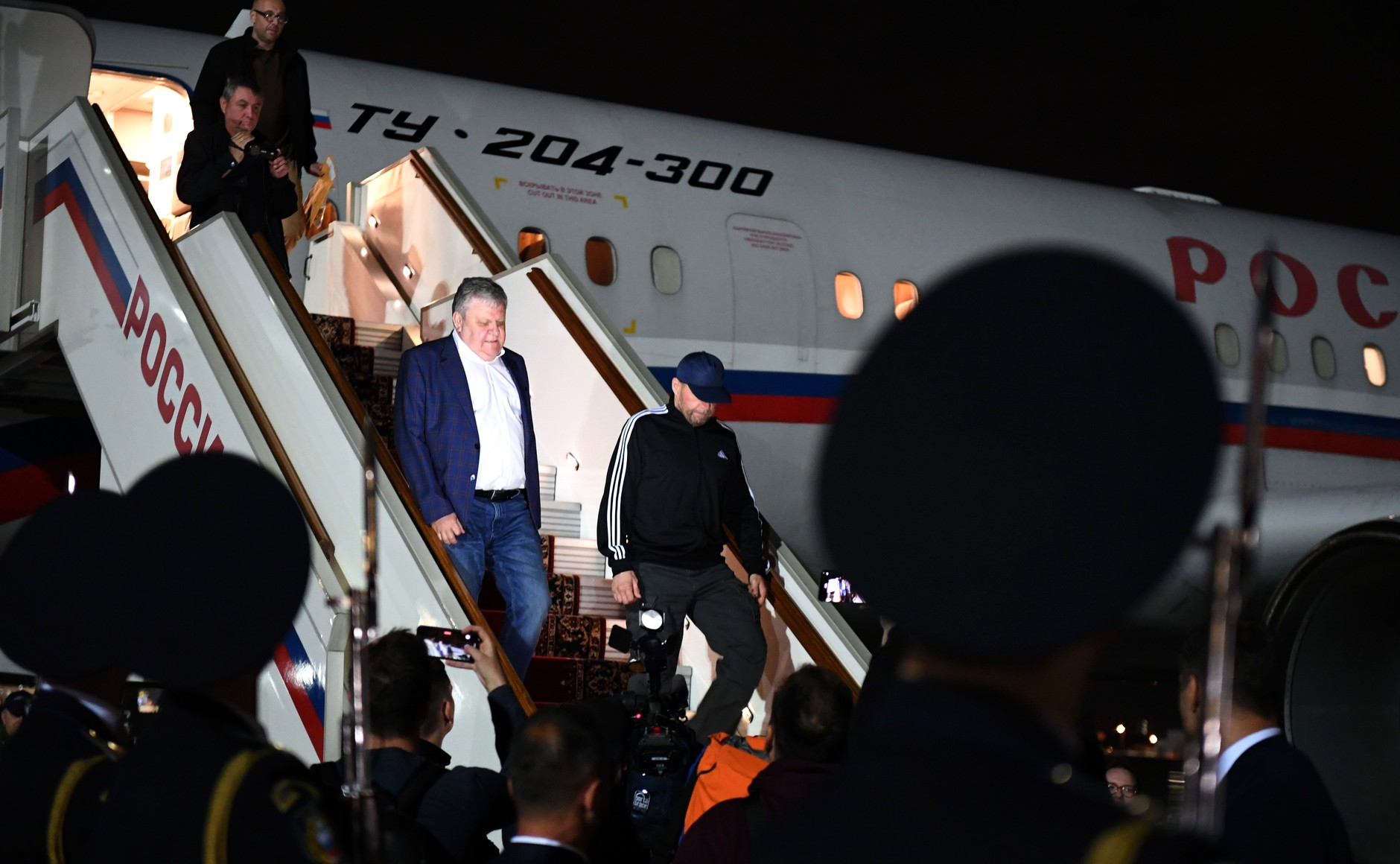
Vadim Krasikov and others are received by a guard of honor at Vnukovo International Airport, Moscow.

The Kremlin press service stated that "the decision to sign [pardoning] decrees was made with the goal of returning Russian citizens who were detained and imprisoned in foreign countries." It was noted that the Russian side is grateful to the leadership of all countries that assisted in the preparation of the exchange and is also thankful to Belarusian President Alexander Lukashenko for pardoning Rico Krieger, who had been sentenced to death in Belarus. He was pardoned by Lukashenko shortly before he was released as part of the prisoner exchange.

According to Meduza, state and pro-government media were given recommendations from the Kremlin's information bloc on how to cover the exchange. When mentioning political prisoners, specific sentences received by exchange participants were to be referenced. Russian political prisoners were to be referred to as "troublemakers and traitors," "agents of the West," and that "nothing serious happened – we got rid of the unnecessary." The citizens received in the exchange were to be noted as those who "worked for the Motherland"; for instance, in reports about Vadim Krasikov, it was to be indicated that he "eliminated a field commander, an enemy."

Novaya Gazeta notes that Russian pro-government media generally covered the prisoner exchange topic in a restrained manner, mostly in news format: Russians were exchanged for "a group of people who acted in the interests of foreign states and conducted subversive activities." In this format, Deputy Chairman of the Russian Security Council Dmitry Medvedev commented on the exchange, stating that it was necessary to "pull out our own" in exchange for traitors.

=== Germany ===
Freed as part of a prisoner swap between Russia and the West, the opposition figures, Andrei Pivovarov, Vladimir Kara-Murza and Ilya Yashin, had mixed feelings about the deal. Kara-Murza stated that article 61 of the Constitution of Russia forbids to deport citizens if they do not approve. None of them did so or was even asked to do so. Yashin added that he is Russian, a Russian politician, and sees himself as a patriot, whose place is in Russia.

Yashin said it was hard to accept that he was free "because a murderer was free" — a reference to Vadim Krasikov, a Russian convicted of killing a former Chechen militant in Berlin in 2019 and released as part of the deal.

They were flown to Germany after being released and met by German Chancellor Olaf Scholz at the Bonn Cologne airport.

"It was not easy for anyone to make this decision to deport a murderer sentenced to life imprisonment after only a few years in prison," Scholz said at the airport. He added he took the decision out of an obligation to protect German nationals and solidarity with the United States.

Kara-Murza defended Scholz's decision, saying the only thing that matters is that human lives were saved by going through with the agreement.

After his return, the Public Prosecutor General started an investigation of Rico Krieger for participating in a bombing plot. Krieger had stated he originally wanted to volunteer with the Ukrainian defense forces Kastuś Kalinoŭski Regiment, but that his online application was answered by the Ukrainian secret service instead. Krieger said he was asked to go to Belarus, take photos of key infrastructure and pick up a backpack in a forest. The next day he was arrested by Belarusian police and later sentenced to death. He was pardoned by Lukashenko shortly before he was released as part of the prisoner exchange.

=== Turkey ===
Turkish Foreign Minister Hakan Fidan praised the "historic" operation and congratulated the National Intelligence Organization staff who took part in the operation. "Türkiye will continue to be the center of peaceful diplomacy in line with the vision of President Recep Tayyip Erdoğan," he added.

The press service of the Turkish Foreign Ministry stated that "from the very beginning of the negotiation process to the final moment of the exchanges, all security measures, logistical planning, and needs of the operation were managed by the National Intelligence Organization."

=== Organizations ===
Reporters Without Borders stated that Gershkovich "should have never spent a single day in a Russian prison", and their director of campaigns Rebecca Vincent called his arrest "outrageous". The Spanish branch of RWB, which had campaigned for Pablo González's right to a trial in Poland, asked him for explanations. The European Centre for Press and Media Freedom celebrated Gershkovich's expected release. Committee to Protect Journalists chief executive Jodie Ginsberg requested the release of all detained journalists in Russia.

== See also ==
- Roger D. Carstens, United States Special Presidential Envoy for Hostage Affairs
- List of American people imprisoned abroad
- Russian spies in the Russo-Ukrainian War
- Gaza war hostage crisis – a hostage situation that occurred during the same period of time
- Iran hostage crisis – a global hostage situation from 1980
