= Russian spies in the Russo-Ukrainian war =

In the context of the Russo-Ukrainian War, in the time leading up to and after the 2022 Russian invasion of Ukraine, a number of citizens of the Russian Federation and of other nationalities working for Russia have been identified publicly as spies or agents of the Federal Security Service (FSB), the foreign intelligence service (SVR), or the military intelligence service (GRU), with each arm having their own remits.

Termed "illegals", operatives without diplomatic accreditation, agents often spend years building up false identities, living a quiet life, though sometimes they then move location/country with their partner, who may or may not know of their espionage activities and any children, who will not know of any nefarious activities. They can be hard to identify, resembling normal people.

== Legals ==
In addition to "illegals", over 600 Russian diplomats have been identified and been declared "persona non grata" in 2022 and 2023 and had their accreditation cancelled, with a number being described as "intelligence officers masquerading as diplomats".

The head of Britain's Secret Intelligence Service (MI6), Richard Moore, reported that roughly half of Russia's spies working under diplomatic cover were expelled from Europe by July 2022.

== Illegals ==
Deep-cover spies, or "illegals", a term for intelligence agents operating without diplomatic cover, have been uncovered in a number of countries. Resembling normal people, many have been uncovered through a combination of their recent activities and heightened awareness by the authorities.

In the 1920s, the Soviet Union was not recognised by many countries and was therefore not given diplomatic representation. The interior ministry of the Soviet Union (NKVD) sent people overseas giving them false documentation and instructions to settle into their new country and acquire contacts that might be useful in the future. The KGB used the same system from the 1950s. In Russia, they are called razvedchik, an approximation of the word 'scout'.

Russia is almost unique in the way it changes the nationality of its Russian born officers and gives them years to build up a false identity in another country, before being called forward to undertake a specific task that may take decades to complete. The number of Russian illegals is not thought to be high, probably less than 100, worked by GRU and SVR with their main aim to get close to political, cultural, industrial and military organisations to enable them to "talent spot", identify people who might be recruited by others.

"Illegals" also cover locals recruited by Russia, espionage groups sent from Russia or other countries sympathetic to Russia to countries and migrant asylum-seekers who have been persuaded to collect intelligence.

=== Albania ===
In August 2022, three people, two Russians and one Albanian, climbed over a wall of a weapons factory before being spotted by guards, whom they attacked with a chemical spray, before being arrested. One supposedly admitted to being a Russian spy; the factory is currently used to repair weapons. The three are being held in detention. One, a woman, had asked for asylum, claiming she would be persecuted if returned to Russia. Albania agreed to the asylum claim. Mikhail Zorin, a Russian who had used the spray, remains in prison in May 2023, the others have been released.

=== Australia ===
In February 2023, a large spy ring whose members included those posing as diplomats, as well a deep-cover identity operatives was uncovered. Operating for 18 months, it was broken by the Australian Security Intelligence Organisation (ASIO). Those involved have had visas not renewed, or cancelled, forcing them to leave the country.

=== Austria ===
A 39-year-old Greek citizen was uncovered as a spy in Vienna in March 2022 when police raided a house and discovered tracking devices, bugs, a device for finding hidden listening devices and cameras as well as phones, tablets and laptops containing 10 million files and a splinter protection suit. The individual, whose father was a former Russian intelligence agent who had been a diplomat in Germany and Austria, had trained in Russia and made 65 trips to other countries since 2018. With no visible income, he owns property in Greece, Austria and Russia and whilst being monitored was seen to use drop boxes to pass information to Russian embassy staff in Vienna.

=== Belgium ===
- Belgium is the HQ of NATO. In October 2021 NATO expelled eight undeclared Russian intelligence officers from their NATO mission, reducing the mission to just 10 Russians. In retaliation, Sergey Lavrov said all staff at NATO's military mission in Moscow would be stripped of their accreditation. Both missions have now closed.
- In March 2022, 21 Russian diplomats were expelled by Belgium. Masquerading as technicians, cleaners, attachés, and trade representatives, all were identified as members of GRU, SVR or FSB. They included Alexei Kuksov the embassy ambassador. Staff levels at the embassy have now fallen below 200.
- A Russian national living in Belgium, running a business specialising in acquiring and sending coordinate-measuring machines to Russian defence businesses, was identified in January 2024 as having previously had an address at the GRU dormitory in Moscow. Viktor Labin and his two sons Roman and Ruslan were identified by Russian media The Insider as owners of Groupe d'Investissement Financier in Belgium with Ruslan Labin owning Moscow based Sonatec LLC.

=== Brazil ===
Police in Brazil are undertaking an investigation after three Russian spies have been identified recently with fake Brazilian identities. One, Sergey Vladimirovich Cherkasov, was sentenced to 15 years in prison in Brazil in July 2022 for identity fraud. (see Greece, Norway and USA) An extradition request by the USA for Cherkasov was refused in July 2023 as Brazil had approved his extradition to Russia in April. The sentence was reduced by the court to 5 years.

=== Bulgaria ===
- On 2 March 2022 Brigadier General Valentin Tsankov (bg:Валентин Цанков) a reserve general in the Bulgarian Army and former military attaché to London 2003-7 and Washington 2007–11, which was terminated when it was discovered he had trained for 10 months with the KGB in Moscow; had also been part of Bulgarian counter intelligence, was arrested after a 2–3-month investigation and accused of spying since 2016, by transferring data on flash drives to the Russian Embassy. Two diplomats working with him were expelled.
- In July 2022, an explosion occurred at a weapons store in Bulgaria, the latest in a sequence of eight explosions going back to 2011. Owned by weapons dealer Emilian Gebrev, who in 2015 survived a Novichok poison attack, the substance having been put on his car door handle, which in 2020 resulted in the charging of three Russian nationals in absentia in connection with the attempted assassination. One of the accused, Denis Sergeyev, is also linked to the 2018 Poisoning of Sergei and Yulia Skripal. Six suspected Russian GRU agents are currently under investigation. On 2 June 2023 another fire broke out at the same arms factory in Karnobat. Russian involvement is suspected, with the Bulgarian Minister commenting that he was "100 percent sure" Russian operatives were responsible for the 2022 explosion.
- In March 2023, Nikolai Malinov, a former Bulgarian lawmaker charged with spying and sanctioned by the USA for funding spy organisations, travelled to Moscow where he has been elected head of the International Movement of Russophiles, an organisation run under Russia's foreign ministry. Malinov, who is currently under investigation and banned from travelling, is standing for election in the April 2023 elections.
- Concerns have been raised regarding Russian connections to the security services in Bulgaria, the heads of which are appointed by the President, who is pro Russia. A number of high profile cases regarding criminals undertaking extortion, narcotics and arms dealing have proven to have Russian connections which link to Politicians and the Judiciary and is not being countered effectively by the security services despite the Chief Prosecutor having been dismissed in June 2023.
- In September 2023 the head of the Russian Orthodox Church in Sofia, Archimandrite Vassian, a Russian citizen, who was already banned from North Macedonia, and two Belarusian clerics, had their residency rights revoked and were expelled for being a risk to Bulgarian security, as was a Russian journalist Alexander Gatsak.

=== Czech Republic ===
In September 2022, a senior Czech Republic diplomat, who worked for the Ministry of Foreign Affairs, was reportedly caught handing confidential information to Russia. Believed to be a mole who had been working with the Russians for a number of years, he had been under surveillance for some time.

=== Estonia ===
- Having set up a business as a cover in 2012, caught, convicted and jailed in 2017, Artem Zinchenko, a Russian GRU spy, was pardoned and swapped in 2018. However he returned to Estonia in late 2022, seeking asylum, claiming he did not agree with the war.
- On 6 December 2022, Vadim Konoshchenok, a suspected (FSB) officer, was arrested at the border with high tech electronic items and ammunition sourced in the USA, additional goods were found in a warehouse Konoshchenok was renting. The USA sought his extradition, which was granted and actioned in July 2023. (see also USA)

=== France ===
- In Summer 2022, a woman called Yulia Shivmanovitch applied for a visa to visit France. It was refused as she is the wife of Alexander Kulagin, identified by French secret services as a spy from Unit 29155 of GRU, who was sent in 2016 to Montenegro to mount a coup d’état and was also involved in the Poisoning of Sergei and Yulia Skripal.
- Bulat Yanborisov, who moved to Paris in 2014 and obtained a residence permit has been exposed in 2023 as a GRU agent, linked to Unit 29155 of GRU, a specialist assassination unit. His cover was as a director of the Silk Way Rally. Phone records and documents show his connection to GRU, Rustam Dzhafarov a GRU official of 29155 was employed by Silk Way. Yanborisov was awarded the Order of Alexander Nevsky by the deputy head of the GRU in 2022.

=== Georgia ===
- Vsevolod Osipov was recruited by the FSB when arrested in Moscow at a demonstration and given an assignment to spy on Libertarian Party of Russia leaders living in Tbilisi. Osipov admitted the FSB connection and offered to become a double agent.

=== Germany ===
- Arrested in 2020, in August 2022, a German reserve Lieutenant Colonel, Ralph G, was charged with sharing information with Russian intelligence from 2014 to 2020 relating to military equipment and personal data on senior officers. After his arrest in 2020, Ralph G admitted to having supplied information to Russian men, but claims not to have known his contacts were working for the GRU. Unpaid, he received "invitations to events organised by the Russian government agencies."
- On 17 October 2022, Yury Orekhov was arrested in Germany under an international arrest warrant. The USA charged him and others arrested in Italy, with unlawfully obtaining U.S. military technology, from at least 2018 and want him extradited. (see also Italy and USA)
- In December 2022, a German national, Carsten Linke, ex-army lieutenant colonel, who worked for a German foreign intelligence service (BND) from 2007, was detained following a tip off from the USA. In January, another German national, Arthur Eller, was detained when arriving at Munich airport from the US, it is believed he passed information from his acquaintance Linke to Russian intelligence from 2021. This makes Linke a double agent. The trial of Linke and Eller, a diamond trader, born in Russia, who came to Germany as a child, began in December 2023 and is expected to last until July 2024. Eller, given the code name by Russia "Puff Adder" was being paid, like Linke, by the FSB and has made a full confession, whilst Linke has remained silent. Amongst the information allegedly taken by Eller to Russia is the hacking by the West of the Wagner Group private communications system and the GPS location of Ukrainian air defence systems. Eller was able to travel to/from Moscow without difficulty as Linke arranged for the BND to escort him through security with €850,000 of Russian cash and phones.
- In April 2023 two Russian exiles, attending a Russian opposition party conference in Berlin, complained of a possible nerve agent poisoning, the victims are a journalist with Agentstvo and Natalia Arno from Free Russia Foundation, who believes she was attacked in her hotel room before she flew back to the USA. The investigation is ongoing.
- In August 2023 a German government official, identified as Thomas H, was arrested after offering his services to Russia, visiting their embassy in Berlin and consulate in Bonn, numerous times. He was employed in a department dealing with procurement of military equipment and information technology.
- Jan Marsalek, former COO of Wirecard who has been a fugitive in Moscow since 2020, is wanted for a €1.9 billion fraud by Germany, is believed to have worked with the GRU and to have been controlling a spy cell in the United Kingdom since 2020, undertaking surveillance of a NATO base in Germany. (see also United Kingdom)
- In 2023, Vladimir Sergienko came to the notice of the authorities when he appeared on Russian television, of Ukrainian birth with recently acquired German and Russia nationality. He was working for Eugen Schmidt of the German right-wing Alternative for Germany party. An investigation by Der Spiegel and other media revealed his connection to Russia's Ilya Oleksandrovich Vechtomov of the FSB.

=== Greece ===
- In January 2023, just after arrests in Slovenia, a woman believed to have been born Irena Alexandrova Romanova, an SVR agent, operating under the name "Maria Tsalla" since 1991, the name taken from a dead infant. Maria, who had acquired Greek citizenship in 2018, fled Athens, where she had been running a knitting supply shop and photo blog. She sent a message handing over her business to her employees and appears to have fled to Kyrgyzstan. It is believed she fled because of links to the arrested couple in Slovakia. (see also Slovenia) Her real husband, who called himself "Gerhard Daniel Campos Wittich" and allegedly having dual citizenship of Brazil and Austria, is also believed to be a spy who has been operating in Brazil running a 3D printing company, which was about to relocate to a site 50m from the US consulate in Rio, until he also vanished in January. Operating apart, the couple whose real surname appears to be Shmyrevs, have met up in Brazil and Cyprus and both had acquired partners in their respective countries.
- Nikos Bogonikolos, a Greek citizen who is the founder of Aratos Group, involved in defence and technology in the Netherlands and Greece, was arrested in Paris on 9 May 2023, pending extradition to the USA. In December 2023, his extradition was agreed. Thought to have been recruited by Russia in 2017 when he was asked to travel to Moscow alone, he is suspected of providing Russia with US high technology, in breach of US sanctions, and having falsified export documentation regarding export destinations.(see also Netherlands)

=== Hungary ===
- In September 2022 Béla Kovács who until 2019 was a Member of the European Parliament (MEP), was sentenced to five years in prison in absentia, for spying for Russia. He now lives in Moscow.
- Hungary did not expel any diplomats in April 2022, instead they allowed the Russian embassy to increase their numbers from 46 to 56. In November 2022, a former employee of the Ministry of Internal Affairs of Ukraine, was intercepted at the Hungarian border, on his way to give a USB drive to the Russian Embassy in Budapest, considered a safe route to provide information to Russia. The USB contained information including personal data about employees of SBU and GUR intelligence services in Ukraine.
- In April 2023, Hungary announced it was pulling out of the International Investment Bank which was based in Budapest and is commonly referred to as Russia's spy bank. Russia then announced the bank would move its headquarters to Russia.

=== Ireland ===
Sergey Vladimirovich Cherkasov, a GRU agent, used the alias Victor Muller Ferreira while living in Ireland for four years and maintained a bank account there to provide support for his application to go to university in the USA in 2018. (see also Brazil, Netherlands and USA)

=== Italy ===
- In March 2023, a Naval Officer, Walter Biot, was found guilty of handing information to Russian embassy staff in a shopping centre car park in Rome in 2021. The officer, in financial difficulties, wanted €5,000 for handing over 19 confidential NATO documents, including those marked "Top Secret." The diplomats were expelled. The Frigate Captain received a jail term of 30 years from a military court, and in January 2024 was sentenced to 20 years in a criminal court. Biot is appealing against being tried twice for the same offence.
- In May 2022, the 140m yacht Scheherazade was raided in the Marina di Carrara shipyard in Tuscany. The crew were all later identified as GRU agents known to the Italian secret service. The yacht was seized but the crew had vanished.
- On 17 October 2022, Artyom Uss, a Russian accused of smuggling US technology to Russia, was one of five Russians arrested on international arrest warrants, one in Germany. Russia subsequently ordered Uss arrested for money laundering as part of a criminal gang and wanted him extradited to Moscow. Given house arrest in November, the extradition was approved in court on 21 March, and an appeal failed, days later, his wife had flown to Moscow 10 days before Uss cut off his electronic tag, fled in a waiting car and then using a false passport flew out of the country on a private plane. He is now in Moscow. (see also Germany and USA)

=== Latvia ===
- In August 2023 Latvia detained a local citizen accused of spying for Russia by collecting and passing information to a group called "Baltic Antifascists" ("Baltijas Antifašisti"). In October several individuals linked to the "Baltic Antifascists" were arrested and charged with spreading pro-Russian propaganda, two being charged with espionage.
- In November 2023, the former Interior Minister, Jānis Ādamsons, was jailed, with an accomplice, for spying for Russia's Federal Security Service. He had been arrested in 2021 after his parliamentary immunity had been removed.
- On 20 December 2023, a Russian citizen was arrested on suspicion of spying, having collected and transmitted information about essential Latvian infrastructure and military facilities to the Russian special services.
- In January 2024 a Latvian member of the European Parliament, Tatjana Ždanoka was named as having long standing links to the Russian FSB by The Insider and other media investigators.

=== Mexico ===
A Mexican citizen, Hector Cabrera Fuentes, who lived a double life with a family in Russia as well as Mexico was arrested in the USA when collecting information about a Russian born, but now an American citizen, who had previously provided information about the Russian government, that Russia purportedly wanted to kill. Fuentes admitted to the plot and was sentenced in June 2022 to 4 years for not registering as a foreign agent.

=== Moldova ===
- Moldova has an added problem on its doorstep, a regional HQ of the FSB in Transnistria, where in April 2022 several small explosions took place, which the Transnistrian government blamed on Ukraine special forces, with the Moldovan President stating that the cause was pro-war forces within the Transnistrian region interested in destabilising the situation.
- In May 2022 Igor Dodon, former President of Moldova, was detained and accused of corruption and treason. It was discovered that Dodon used to send drafts of his speeches to high ranking Russian security officials and an FSB General, Dmitry Milyutin, flew to Moldova to attend Dodon's inauguration in 2016. In 2019 Russian political strategists flew in to "help" with the mayoral elections, then with the presidential in 2020 and parliament and local in 2021. Released documents purport to show election involvement and contribution by the General Staff of the Russian Army and the intelligence services, the FSB, SVR and GRU. Dodon, who had lost the presidential election in 2020, was released from house arrest in November 2022 but remains under investigation, including that of having allegedly received USD1m in 2019 from US sanctioned Moldovan politician and oligarch, Vladimir Plahotniuc, whose whereabouts are currently unknown, and of high treason.
- In March 2023, police arrested members of a network "orchestrated by Moscow" in a bid to destabilize the country through demonstrations after an agent managed to infiltrate the group which was being trained by people travelling from Russia and financed by the Șor Party. In April 2023 Ilan Shor who led the pro Russian Șor Party was convicted of fraud and sentenced to 15 years in jail; he had fled to Israel in 2019. The Vice President, Marina Tauber was arrested at the airport trying to leave the country for Israel following investigations into the Șor Party finances.
- Two Russian citizens named as Iurii G. and Vadim I., identified as FSB operatives, have been operating since 2020, recruiting locals and organising hostile activities against the government. Their group has been dismantled and in July 2023 the Moldovan Intelligence and Security Service were working with the Prosecutor's Office on a criminal case for treason and espionage.
- On 13 September, Vitali Denisov, head of Sputnik news in Moldova, was deported without the opportunity to collect his personal belongings and banned for 10 years, it is believed he is a Russian Colonel and GRU officer.

=== Montenegro ===
In September 2022 an investigation linked six Russian diplomats with twenty eight Russian citizens holding temporary visas for Montenegro and two local citizens in a spy investigation. The diplomats were expelled. The Russian citizens were later banned from Montenegro and the two locals, one an ex-diplomat, face charges of illegal weapons, organising a criminal organisation and espionage.

=== Netherlands ===
- Sergey Vladimirovich Cherkasov a Russian citizen using a false Brazilian identity "Victor Muller Ferreira" tried to infiltrate the International Criminal Court (ICC) through an internship. Picked up at Schiphol airport after a tip off, he was declared an unwanted Alien by the Netherlands and deported back to Brazil. He is in prison in Brazil having been sentenced to 5 years and 2 months (reduced from 15 years) for identity fraud. (see also USA)
- Founder of satellite technology company Aratos Group in the Netherlands, Nikos Bogonikolos, a Greek citizen, was arrested on 9 May 2023, charged with providing Russia with ultra modern technology in breach of US sanctions, including semiconductors used in cryptology and nuclear testing. His extradition from France, where he had been arrested, directly to the US was agreed in December 2023. (see also Greece)

=== Norway ===
- In October 2022 a man known as José Assis Giammaria (38) was arrested in Norway claiming to be a Brazilian, who had spent time at the University of Calgary, Canada. He was an intern at UiT The Arctic University, Norway and was involved with the Center for Peace Studies. Identified as Russian national Mikhail Valerievich Mikushin (45), a name and nationality to which he admitted in December 2023, believed by Bellingcat to be a Colonel in the GRU, the suspect has been charged with gathering intelligence linked to state secrets. In court Mikushin also admitted to being a Colonel in the GRU.
- In October 2023, an investigation revealed that two people purporting to be employees of the Russian Geographical Society, whose president is General of the Army, Sergei Shoigu, tried to recruit a Russian speaking Norwegian as a spy, offering a fee of $1,000 per day to take photographs of military areas.

=== Poland ===
- March 2022, a Polish employee of the Warsaw Registry Office was arrested on suspicion of transferring operationally valuable data to the Russian intelligence services including undertaking checks on specific people, including foreigners who were living in Poland.
- 28 February 2022 Pablo González Yagüe, a freelance journalist, who is a dual Spanish/Russian national, was arrested in Przemysl, south-eastern Poland, by the ABW on suspicion of spying for Moscow. Poland disclosed that he had two passports, a Russian in his birth name of Pavel Rubtsov and a second Spanish passport with his Spanish language version of his name. It is claimed he was spying on Zhanna Nemtsova, daughter of murdered Russian opposition leader Boris Nemtsov. He has been held on pre-trial detention since arrested. Since his arrest, a personal data leak from the Russian global distribution system Sirena Travel showed him traveling within Russia alongside the GRU operative Sergei Turbin.
- April 2022, a Russian citizen was arrested under suspicion of providing classified military information to the GRU. Prosecutors have since charged the man, who is a long-term resident in Poland, with spying for Russia between 2015 and 2022. The man, who ran a business in Poland, was allegedly involved with historical reconstruction groups, became a parachute trainer and made contacts with Polish military personnel whilst looking at military operations and equipment along the Belarus border, transferring the obtained information to the GRU.
- March 2023, six citizens, "foreigners from across the eastern border", charged with preparing acts of sabotage and spying for Russia. "Evidence indicates that this group monitored railway lines. Their tasks included recognising, monitoring and documenting weapons' transports to Ukraine." Some cameras were found near the small regional Rzeszow-Jasionka airport to record activity. In March 2023, three more were arrested. The nine were believed to be preparing to undertake sabotage, three were from Belarus. In April another three took the total to twelve in detention with over 50 surveillance devices located. On 11 June, a Russian professional hockey player became the 14th to be arrested, accused of being paid for undertaking reconnaissance. In July a 15th was arrested, a Ukrainian citizen, who had been in Poland since 2019. In August a 16th, Mikhail A., a Belarusian citizen was arrested. The spy network of amateurs appears to have been used to avoid risking Russian operatives. All 16 were charged after confessing to sabotage and propaganda activities under the direction of Russian intelligence, in November 2023. In December 2023 14 who had pleaded guilty were found guilty in court of preparing acts of sabotage and carrying out intelligence activities for Moscow, including Maxim S a Russian ice hockey player, two Ukrainian lawyers, a teacher, a political scientist, a pharmacy technician and a software engineer. The trial of the remaining two will take place in 2024
- A foreign citizen was arrested in Gdańsk on 21 March 2023, accused of spying for Russia, he had been in the country since January and was collecting information on critical infrastructure. A police enquiry showed the Ukrainian citizen was forced to spy for Russia and was sentenced to 1 year in prison in November 2023.
- A Russian, Emran Navruzbekov, claiming to have served with FSB in counter intelligence was refused entry to Poland on 6 June 2023, after his story of being in the FSB was checked and he was thought to be unreliable and a risk to Poland.
- On 14 August 2026, Polish prime minister Donald Tusk said authorities, working with U.S. services, foiled an alleged Russian plot to kill a Ukrainian-American citizen in Warsaw and arrested a suspect accused of acting for Russian intelligence. Tusk affirmed it was the first such Russian-directed plot in another NATO country.

=== Serbia ===
On 11 July 2023, the US sanctioned Aleksandar Vulin, a Serbian politician and head of the Serbian intelligence agency, due to his close connections to Russia and alleged illegal arms deals and other criminal activities. In November 2023 Vulin resigned his position whilst denying involvement in illegal arms shipments, drug trafficking and misuse of public office.

=== Slovakia ===
In March 2022, two Slovak citizens were charged with spying and bribery, accused of obtaining highly sensitive, strategic and classified information about Slovakia, its armed forces and NATO and handed them over to Russian Embassy based undercover GRU officers in return for money. One, Colonel Pavel Buczyk, was the head of a Security and Defense Department at the Armed Forces Academy and had GRU contact going back 10 years. The other, Bohuš Garbár, worked for a pro-Russian conspiracy website known as Hlavne spravy. Both have confessed, Garbár has been sentenced to three years in jail and the diplomats in Russia's embassy were declared persona non grata.

=== Slovenia ===
In December 2022, two foreign nationals were arrested, now believed to be Russian citizens working for Russia's foreign intelligence service (SVR), under the false names of Maria Rosa Mayer Munos and Ludwig Gisch, they had used forged Argentinian passports to settle in Ljubljana with their children in 2017. A large amount of cash was seized. They are charged with espionage. In June 2023, the pair was named as Artem Viktorovich Dultsev and Anna Valerevna Dultseva. (see also Greece)

=== Sweden ===
- In late 2021, Peyman Kia and Payam Kia, brothers, born in Iran, were arrested for spying. Peyman Kia reportedly served in the Office for Special Acquisition (KSI) part of Sweden's security service and the two of them were working for Russia over a ten-year period. One was sentenced to life, the other to 9 years in jail in January 2023.
- In November 2022, a couple living in Nacka, Sweden for over 20 years were arrested in a dawn raid using Black Hawk helicopters. Sergey Skvortsov and Elena Koulkova are believed to be Russian citizens, suspected of aggravated illegal intelligence activities including the illegal acquisition of technology for the Russian military industry, on behalf of GRU. Mr. Skvortsov reportedly studied at the Moscow Power Engineering Institute, while Ms. Koulkova, born in 1964, is said to have graduated from the Faculty of Computational Mathematics and Cybernetics at Moscow State University. They owned a flat in 36 Zorge Street, Moscow, well known as a place GRU agents live, including Denis Sergeev who is linked to the poisoning of Sergei and Yulia Skripal and General Andrei Vladimirovich Averyanov head of Unit 29155 of GRU. Elena Koulkova was released, but Skvortsov was charged, then tried in September 2023, with sourcing advanced electronic equipment over a number of years, using false identities and failing to declare technology being exported to Russia. Skvortsov was found not guilty.
- In April 2023 a Russian woman was detained at an oil refinery where she worked on espionage charges, her nationality had not been previously disclosed.

=== Ukraine ===
- The Security Service of Ukraine (SBU) has been actively at war with the Russian secret services since the 2014 Invasion of Ukraine. Hampered with a number of ex-KGB operatives left over from the USSR era, occupying positions of power in Ukraine, with the addition of more recent recruits, it has taken time to identify the subversives, such as the network led by Andrii Derkach, and Andrii Naumov who was in a senior position in the SBU, who fled Ukraine hours before the invasion. By July 2022 651 prosecutions had been opened against prosecutorial and law enforcement officials in Ukraine, with over 16,000 cases of treason being opened by Ukraine prosecutors by February 2023.
- Denys Kireyev, a Ukrainian banker, was killed in Kyiv in March 2022 just after he attended a peace negotiation in Belarus. Having been recruited by Russia's FSB he was credited with informing Ukrainian military of Russia's intention to use the Hostomel Airport as a stepping stone to capture Kyiv, indicating he was a Ukrainian GUR double agent. Arrested by Ukraine's SBU he was shot and killed. Whether the SBU knew he was a GUR double agent, whether he was assassinated, or shot by accident, or whether it was a Russian agent in SBU who killed him is unknown.

=== United Kingdom ===
- Arrested in 2021, in February 2023, David Ballantyne Smith from Scotland pleaded guilty under the Official Secrets Act to spying for Russia and has been jailed for 13 years. Working as a security guard at the British embassy in Berlin he used the opportunity to take photos and leak documents and video footage to cause embarrassment and was paid small sums for his efforts. He was caught using a British Agent posing as a Russian defector and was found with documents in his home.
- In August 2023, three Bulgarian nationals were arrested and charged under the Official Secrets Act with 19 identity documents and passports for a number of EU countries, after being suspected of spying for Russia. Named as Orlin Roussev, Bizer Dzhambazov and Katrin Ivanova, they had been living in the UK for over 10 years, one in Great Yarmouth and two of them together in Harrow. One claimed to run a business involving the interception of communications or electronic signals. In September two more were charged, Ivan Stoyanov, and Vanya Gaberova. Roussev operated in the UK and was the link with the others who operated in the UK and Europe, including a surveillance operation in Montenegro. All five have been additionally charged with undertaking surveillance and an abduction plot to assist the Russian state in hostile acts. A link has been made to Jan Marsalek, an Austrian and former COO of Wirecard who has been a fugitive since 2020, wanted for a €1.9 billion fraud by Germany, he is believed to be living in Moscow under FSB protection and has acquired Russian citizenship. Marsalek has known GRU contacts and this cell he appears to command, has been active since 2020, tasked with acquiring military equipment, communication interception and undertaking surveillance of a NATO base in Germany.
- In December 2023, concerns were raised regarding the Russian owner of a flat overlooking the UK MI6 headquarters in London, the corporate owner, having in the past owned a property 300m from the secret Russian chemical site that developed Novichok.

=== United States of America ===
- In July 2022, a Russian foreign agent has been indicted by a Federal grand jury in Tampa, USA. Charged with running a campaign to influence political groups such as the Uhuru Movement and turn US citizens into tools of Russia, through funding and sowing discord over a seven-year period, Aleksandr Lanov an FSB agent.
- In July 2022, Walter Primrose and his wife Gwynn Morrison, were arrested in Hawaii after it was discovered that in 1987 they had assumed the identities of the babies that had died, Bobby Fort and Julie Montague. Primrose had worked for a defense contractor before vanishing and adopting new names, and remarried in 1988. In 1994, Bobby Fort joined the Coast Guard before returning as a defense contractor. Photos were found of them in KGB uniforms along with invisible ink kits, code books and maps of military bases.
- In September 2022, an Army doctor and her wife, an anesthesiologist, were arrested and charged with attempting to provide medical information on military personnel to Russia.
- In October 2022, arrests were made in Germany and Italy of Russians wanted for unlawfully obtaining U.S. military technology and Venezuelan oil sanction breaking. In March 2023, one of the Russians, Artyom Uss, broke house arrest and fled Italy in a private plane just before he was extradited. Vladimir Jovancic, a citizen of Bosnia and Herzegovina, who lives in Serbia was arrested in Croatia and charged in the US with obstructing justice and assisting the escape of Uss from custody. (see also Italy and Germany)
- December 2022 saw the arrest by the FBI of two US citizens, Vadim Yermolenko and Alexey Brayman (who also has Ukrainian and Israeli citizenship) and five Russian nationals, one of which is a suspected FSB Officer. Charged with helping Russian Intelligence Agencies evade sanctions and money laundering by seeking to buy advanced electronics and specialist sniper ammunition using dozens of shell companies and corresponding bank accounts throughout the U.S. Vadim Konoshchenok, the suspected FSB officer, self-identified as a Colonel, was arrested in Estonia on December 6, 2022. (see also Estonia)
- In January 2023, a former FBI officer, Charles McGonigal, was arrested and charged with secretly taking 225,000 dollars from a former Albanian spy, Sergey Shestakov, who is now a US citizen, and violating U.S. sanctions by secretly working for a Kremlin-linked Russian oligarch, Oleg Deripaska, he once investigated. In August 2023, McGonigal pleaded guilty as part of a plea agreement and was sentenced to 50 months in prison and given a fine of $200,000 in December 2023.
- March 2023, Sergey Vladimirovich Cherkasov, who allegedly served as an agent for the GRU Russian intelligence service under the Brazilian alias of Victor Muller Ferreira from 2012. He entered the US in 2018 to attend a graduate school in Washington. He is charged with various offenses including acting as a foreign agent, wire fraud, bank fraud and visa fraud. He was deported by the Netherlands to Brazil, after trying to obtain a job with the International Criminal Court (ICC) and is currently in jail for 5 years (reduced from 15 years) on identity theft and fraud charges. Covert communications equipment has been recovered from remote locations in Brazil that Cherkasov had allegedly hidden. Russia has admitted he is a Russian citizen from Kaliningrad and is trying to get him extradited on narcotics charges, believed to be false. (see also Brazil, Ireland and Netherlands)
- On 11 May 2023, two Russian nationals, Oleg Patsulya and Vasilii Besedin, were arrested in Arizona and charged with trying to procure over $2m of civilian aircraft parts to send to Russia, for Smartavia and Podeba airlines in violation of US sanctions.
- In December 2023, Ruslan Aleksandrovich Peretyatko, an FSB Center 18 officer and Andrey Stanislavovich Korinets who assisted, were charged with launching a “sophisticated spear phishing campaign" against the UK and USA in 2019. There is a $10m reward out for Peretyatko.

== Other areas of spying ==
- Fishing vessels – Russian fishing vessels have been accused of spying on undersea cables, gas and oil pipes, exploring wind farms and listening in to communications.
- Cyber malware – The USA claims to have disrupted a long standing Russian FSB malware programme called "snake", that has targeted many NATO computer networks around the world.
- Cyber attacks on organisations, such as against the Parliament of Finland in April and August 2022 and the International Criminal Court in September 2023.
- Creating division and inciting anti-government actions – Germany warns of anti-government violent extremism being fuelled by Russia.
- Acquiring sanctioned goods and smuggling them to Russia – A number of countries have identified smugglers of technology and sanctioned goods.
- Using surveillance equipment on the roofs of various Russian embassies.
- Interfering with elections in many world countries using its spy network, state-run media and social media to spread mistrust in results.
- Utilising members of the Russian Orthodox Church based outside Russia to spread Russian propaganda and spy.
- Bribery and undercover services, the Russian embassy in Rome has withdrawn €4m in cash in 18 months for unstated reasons.
- Utilising businesses set up specifically in EU/G7 countries to covertly buy sensitive/hi tech equipment, with orders for the purchases being given by Russian Intelligence Services.

== Cross border assistance ==
The number of cases of cross border identification and arrest shows a close working relationship between different counter espionage and security forces, especially in NATO countries. MI5 confirmed that data about Russian agents is shared between European allies.

== See also ==
- Diplomatic expulsions during the Russo-Ukrainian War
- Poisoning of Sergei and Yulia Skripal
- List of people and organizations sanctioned during the Russo-Ukrainian War
- 2024 Russian prisoner exchange
