= Yevgeny Roizman =

Russian politician (born 1962)

- Евгений Ройзман
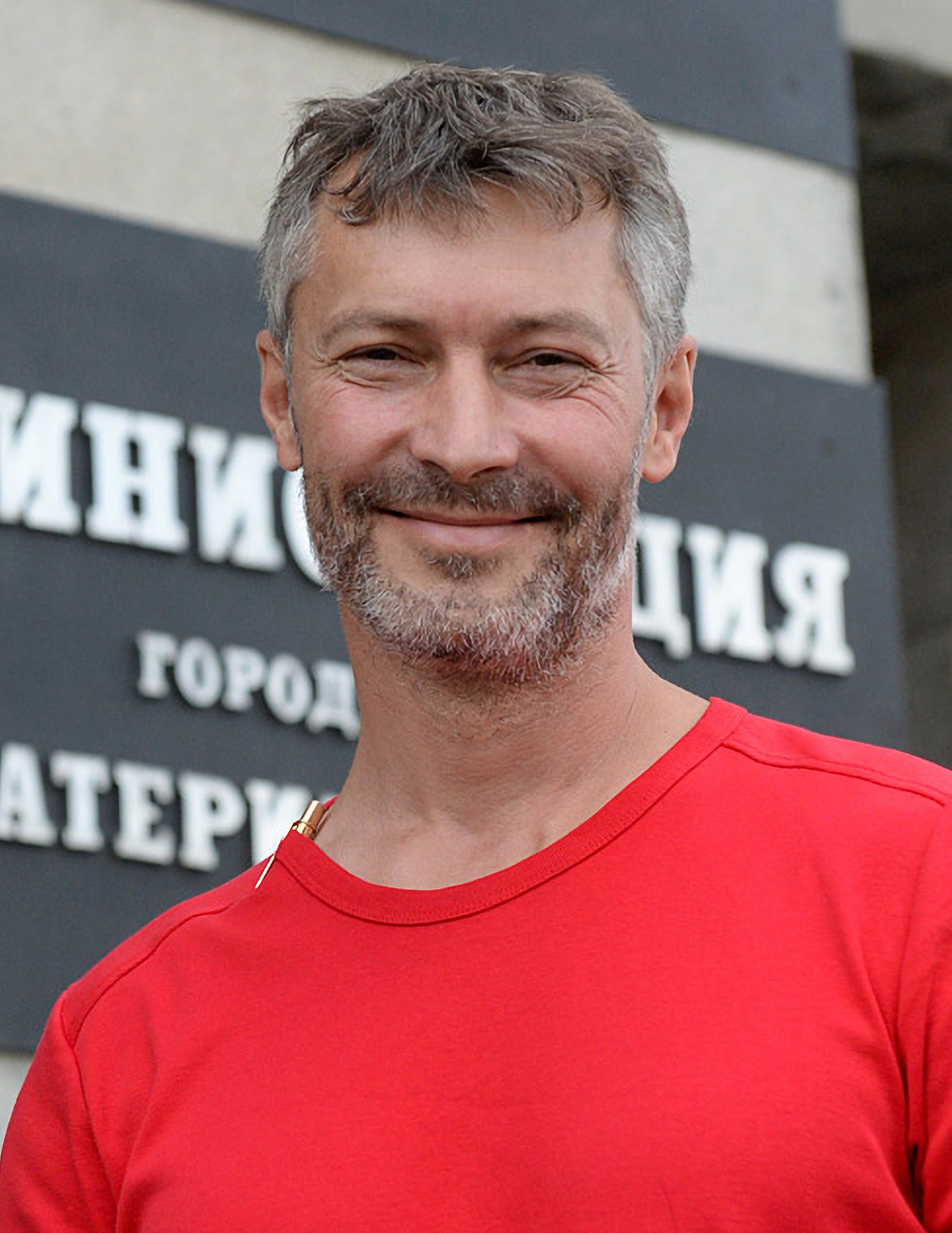
- Roizman in 2018

Mayor of Yekaterinburg Head of Yekaterinburg City Duma
- In office 24 September 2013 – 25 May 2018
- Governor: Yevgeny Kuyvashev
- Preceded by: Yevgeny Porunov
- Succeeded by: Alexander Vysokinsky

Member of the State Duma
- In office 29 December 2003 – 24 December 2007

Personal details
- Born: Yevgeny Vadimovich Roizman; 14 September 1962 (age 64) Sverdlovsk, Russian SFSR, Soviet Union (now Yekaterinburg)
- Party: A Just Russia (2005–2006); Right Cause (June–September 2011); Civic Platform (2012–2015)
- Spouse: Yuliya Kruteyeva
- Children: 5
- Education: Ural State University
- Occupation: Politician, historian, poet, author, art collector, entrepreneur, YouTuber
- Awards: Order of Saint Righteous Grand Duke Dmitry Donskoy (3rd class)
- Yevgeny Roizman's voice recorded April 2013

Yevgeny Vadimovich Roizman (Russian: Евге́ний Вади́мович Ро́йзман; born 14 September 1962) is a Russian opposition politician who served as the mayor of Yekaterinburg from 2013 to 2018. He campaigned against corrupt police, illegal drug sellers and for drug rehabilitation centers.

== Early life ==
He was born in Sverdlovsk to a Jewish father and a Russian mother. His father was a power engineer at Uralmash, while his mother was a nursery teacher. Roizman claims to have left home at age 14, to have traveled across the country and later to have started work at Uralmash as a welder. He graduated from Ural State University as a historian/archivist. He was sentenced to a two-year prison term in 1981 on charges of theft and fraud.

== Philanthropy ==
Roizman is the founder of Museum of Nevyansk Icon at Sverdlovsk region. This is the first private museum to collect icon-paintings. It is located in the city of Yekaterinburg. This museum has over 600 exhibits, including icons, gospel covers, crosses, books and wooden sculptures. The earliest icon is The Egyptian Mother of God (1734), the latest is Christ Pantocrator (1919). Roizman worked in finding, searching and restoration of the icons. Roizman also owns a museum-grade collection of the 20th century art originating from the Urals.

In 1999, Roizman cofounded the City Without Drugs program. He operates a drug rehab center in Yekaterinburg. He was accused by city officials of kidnapping drug-addicts.

== Political career ==
Roizman was a State Duma deputy between 2003 and 2007, and attempted to run for parliament from the A Just Russia party in 2007, but was taken off the election list after a conflict with party leaders. Until 2015, he was a political ally of Mikhail Prokhorov and was supported by the Civic Platform party.

=== Mayor of Yekaterinburg ===
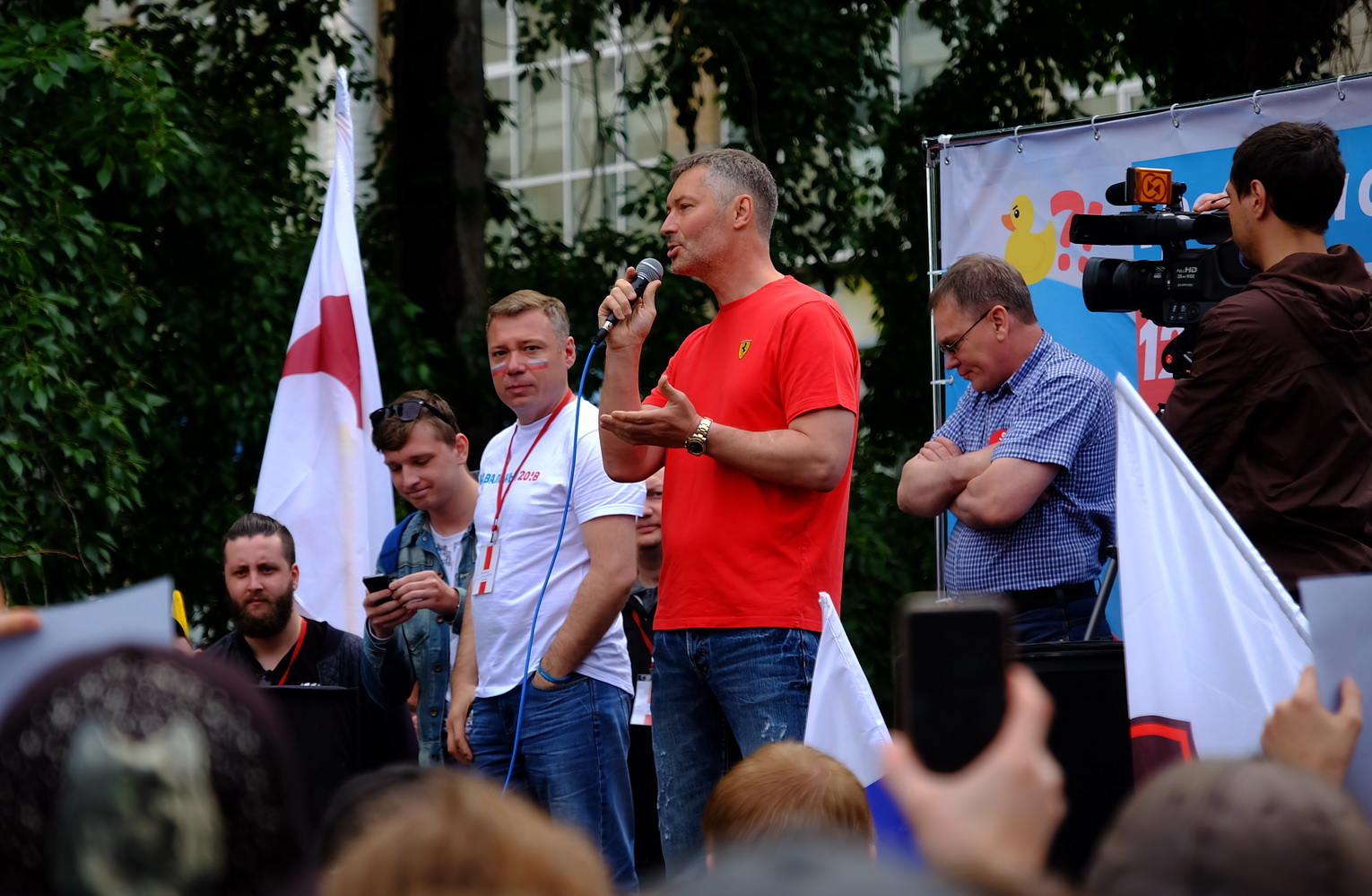
Roizman at an anti-corruption rally in Yekaterinburg on June 12, 2017

He was elected Mayor of Yekaterinburg on September 9, 2013, with over 30 percent of the vote, beating United Russia candidate Yakov Silin who got under 29 percent.

In 2018, Roizman resigned after Russian authorities decided to scrap mayoral elections in the city.

=== Gubernatorial campaign ===
In May 2017, Roizman announced that he would stand in gubernatorial elections in September as the candidate from the liberal opposition party Yabloko. He challenged acting Sverdlovsk Governor Yevgeny Kuyvashev, a United Russia politician with whom Roizman has a longstanding personal rivalry.

== Political positions ==
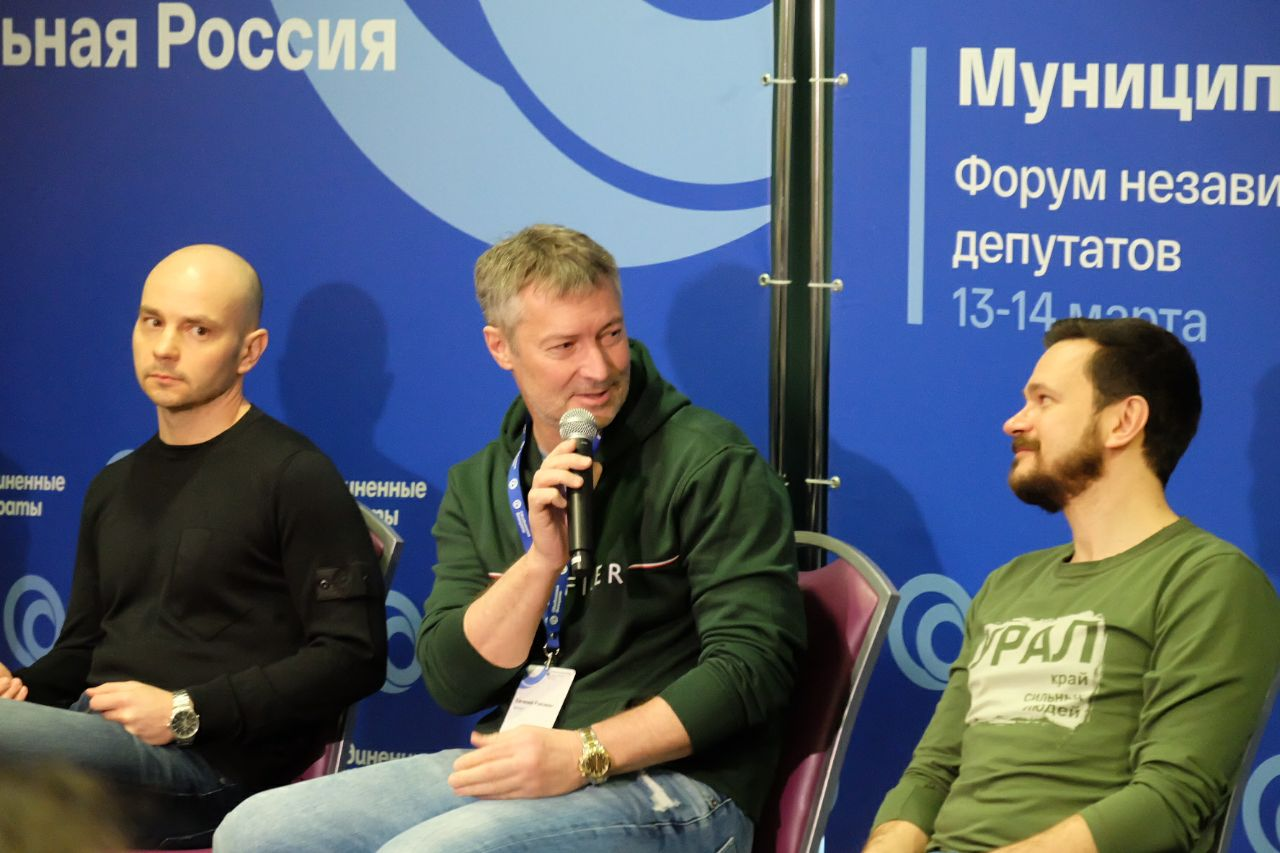
Roizman with Andrei Pivovarov and Ilya Yashin at the "Municipal Russia" forum in Moscow, 2021

Roizman was outspoken against the Russian invasion of Ukraine and called it the "betrayal of Russians". In regards to the threat of being arrested at any moment, he told Agence France-Presse in July 2022: "I have no illusions. But I also have no fear".

== Arrest and criminal charges ==
In 2022, two protocols were drawn up against Roizman for "discrediting" the Russian Armed Forces due to his social media posts and a video, in which he pleaded not guilty on 29 March; the court would consider a third protocol on 7 April.

On 24 August 2022, Roizman was detained by police who said he was being charged with "discrediting" the military. Other properties linked to Roizman were also raided by police, according to media reports, which also stated that he was detained because of his YouTube videos; Roizman was previously fined three times under the same law. On 29 August, the Commission on Security and Cooperation in Europe called on Russia to drop all charges against Yevgeny Roizman.

On 20 September, Roizman accused representatives of law enforcement agencies of collaborating with criminal structures that receive information about his whereabouts and wiretapping. On 21 September, Roizman refused to testify in the case of discrediting the Russian Armed Forces.

On 26 April 2023, Roizman went on trial. He pleaded not guilty to the charge, which carried a maximum prison sentence of five years. He has kept a low profile since receiving the relatively lenient sentence of a fine.
