= Ksenia Fadeeva =

Russian opposition politician

- Ксения Владиславовна Фадеева

Personal details
- Born: February 2, 1992 (age 34) Tomsk, Russia
- Party: Progress Party (since 2013)
- Education: Tomsk State University
- Occupation: Politician, opposition activist
- Known for: Regional coordinator of Alexei Navalny's headquarters in Tomsk; member of the Tomsk City Duma (2020–2024)

Ksenia Fadeeva (Russian: Ксения Владиславовна Фадеева) is a Russian opposition politician, former regional coordinator of Alexei Navalny Headquarters in Tomsk.

== Early life and education ==
Fadeeva graduated from the Faculty of International Law of Tomsk State University in 2014. During her student years, she actively participated in pickets and rallies, and was repeatedly detained and find for voicing her opinions. In 2015, she became the regional coordinator of the Golos movement.

== Career ==
In 2020, she won at the local elections and was elected to the Tomsk city council.

In 2021, when Navalny's Foundation for Fighting Corruption (FBK) was declared an "extremist organization", many of former coordinators and employees of Alexey Navalny’s regional campaign offices faced potential persecution. In late December 2021, Fadeeva's home was searched. By decision of the Kirovsky District Court in Tomsk, Fadeeva was placed under pre-trial restrictions.

On December 29, 2023, after a closed trial Fadeeva was sentenced to 9 years in prison under extremists charges. She was also fined 500,000 rubles ($5,500). The sentence was widely condemned and perceived as politically motivated.

== Release in 2024 prisoner exchange ==
On 1 August 2024, Fadeeva was released as one of 16 prisoners freed by Russia and Belarus in the 2024 Ankara prisoner exchange. The exchange, which took place at Ankara Esenboğa Airport in Turkey, involved 26 individuals in total, including American journalist Evan Gershkovich, former U.S. Marine Paul Whelan, and Russian opposition figures Vladimir Kara-Murza, Ilya Yashin, and Andrei Pivovarov. Fadeeva and the other freed Russian political prisoners were flown to Germany, where they were met by German Chancellor Olaf Scholz at Cologne Bonn Airport. Fadeeva stated publicly that she had not given her consent to the exchange.
