= Mikushin =

Mikushin (Russian: Микушин or Мику́шин) is a surname. Notable people with the surname include:

- Mikhail Mikushin (born 1978), a Russian researcher and suspected spy
- Vladislav Mikushin (born 2001), a Russian football player
