= Alsu Kurmasheva =

Russian and American journalist (born 1976)

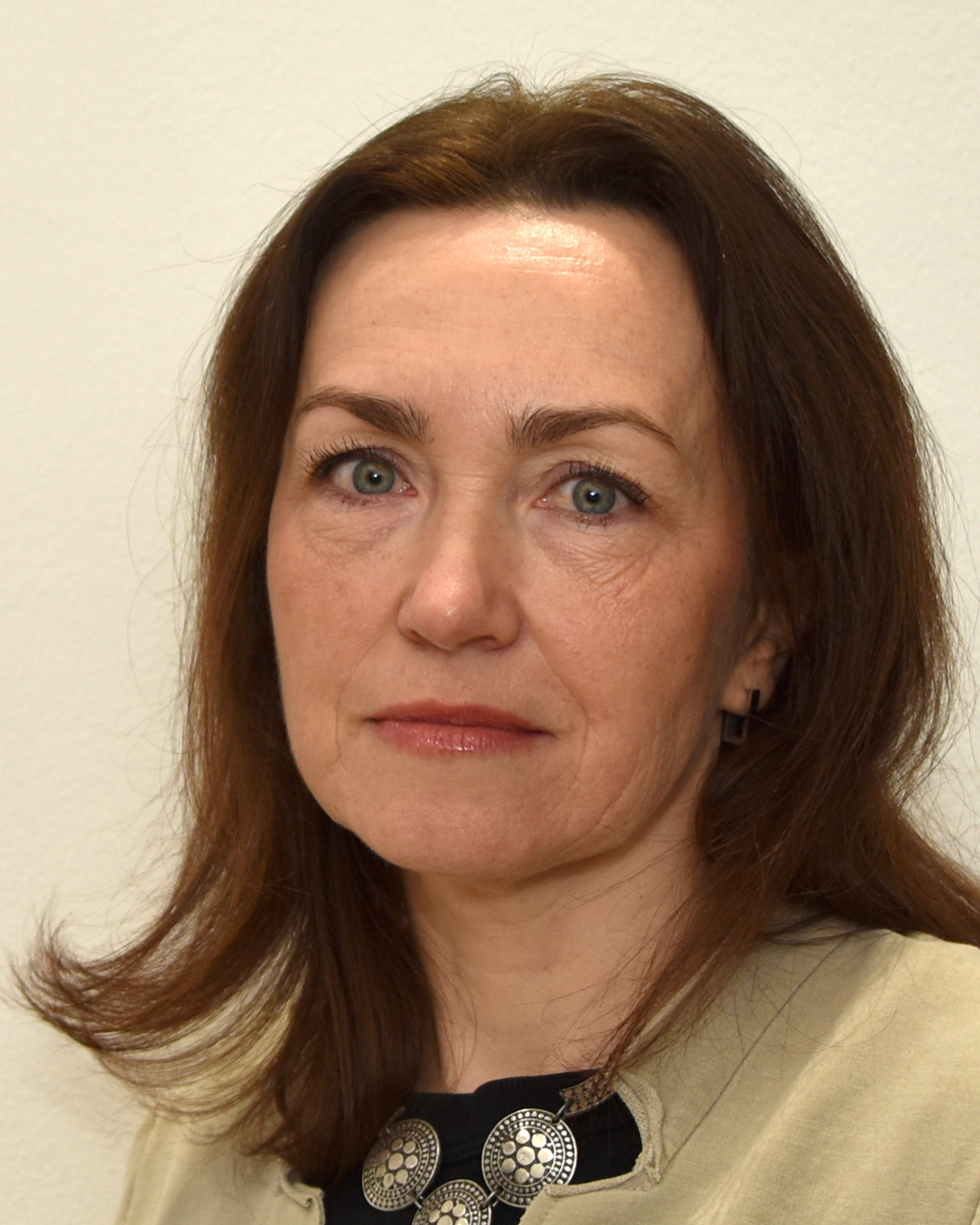
- Kurmasheva in 2024
- Born: September 1, 1976 (age 50); Kazakh SSR, Soviet Union
- Citizenship: United States and Russia
- Occupation: Journalist
- Known for: Detainment in Russia
- Criminal charges: Failure to register as a foreign agent
- Criminal status: Released on August 1, 2024 during prisoner exchange
- Children: 2

Alsu Khamidovna Kurmasheva (Russian: Алсу Хамидовна Курмашева, Tatar: Алсу Хәмид кызы Кормашева, romanized: Alsu Xämid qızı Qormaşeva; born September 1, 1976) is a Russian and American journalist with Radio Free Europe/Radio Liberty's Tatar-Bashkir Service. Kurmasheva was arrested in Kazan, Russia on October 18, 2023, and charged with failure to register as a foreign agent. The charge carried a potential sentence of five years in prison. Kurmasheva was released on August 1, 2024 as part of a prisoner exchange.

== Early life and education ==
Alsu Khamidovna Kurmasheva was born on September 1, 1976 in Kazakh SSR, Soviet Union. She is an ethnic Tatar.

== Career ==
Kurmasheva incorporates Tatar culture and language in her journalism. She works for Radio Free Europe/Radio Liberty's Tatar-Bashkir Service. She speaks Crimean Tatar, Russian, Czech, English, Turkish, Volga Tatar, and Bashkir fluently. Kurmasheva has taught the Crimean Tatar language online.

== Detainment ==
Kurmasheva entered Russia on May 20, 2023, to deal with a family emergency, according to RFE/RL. She visited her sick elderly mother living in Tatarstan, Russia. Kurmasheva was temporarily detained while waiting for her return flight on June 2, 2023, at Kazan airport and authorities confiscated Kurmasheva's passports, preventing her from leaving the country. She was fined 10,000 rubles for failing to register her U.S. passport on October 11, 2023, according to court documents.

Kurmasheva was detained again on October 18, 2023, and charged with failure to register as a foreign agent, punishable by up to five years in prison. Specifically, the charges against Kurmasheva allege that she "deliberately conducted a targeted collection of military information about Russian activities via the internet to transmit information to foreign sources." Her lawyer, Edgar Matevosyan, said she was pleading not guilty. On October 20, 2023, Russian authorities extended Kurmasheva's detention by three days. On October 23, 2023, a district court in Kazan rejected Kurmasheva's request for pretrial measures avoiding incarceration, instead assigning her to a detention center until December 5, 2023.

Kurnasheva's detainment garnered significant criticism, particularly from Western governments and international human rights and media freedom organizations. Dmitry Kolezev, a prominent Russian journalist, characterized her arrest as "another hostage has been taken." The Committee to Protect Journalists demanded Russia release Kurmasheva, expressing "deep concern" with her detention and stating "journalism is not a crime." The U.S. State Department claimed Kurmasheva's detention was a case of Russian harassment of U.S. citizens. Kremlin spokesman Dmitry Peskov denied that Russia was harassing Americans. According to the Associated Press, analysts believe Russia may be using jailed Americans as bargaining chips after the increase of Russian-U.S. tensions following the Russian invasion of Ukraine. On April 1, 2024, a Russian court extended her detention until June 5, 2024.

In July 2024, Kurmasheva was secretly sentenced to 6.5 years in prison for spreading "false information" about the Russian army. The charges were related to a book she had edited after the Russian invasion of Ukraine, "Saying No To War," which featured stories of 40 Russians who opposed the invasion.

== Release ==
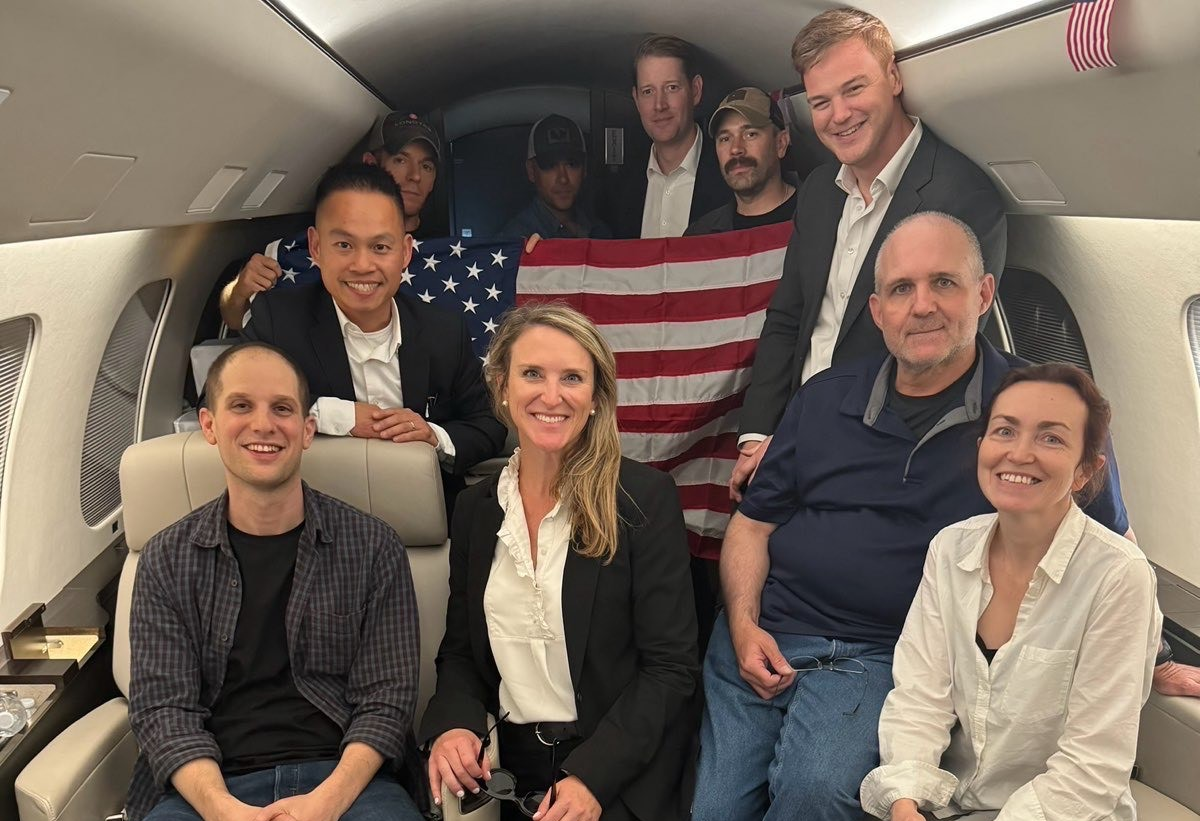
Kurmasheva, Gershkovich and Whelan together with government officials and staff on their return flight to the U.S. on 1 August 2024

On August 1, 2024, Kurmasheva, alongside Paul Whelan, Evan Gershkovich, and various other individuals, was released in a 26 person prisoner exchange. After her release, Kurmasheva attended Post Isolation Support Activities, a 10-day program offered by the Department of Defense to help former hostages acclimate back to regular life.

== Personal life ==
Kurmasheva holds both U.S. and Russian citizenship. She is married to Russian American journalist Pavel Butorin, who immigrated to the United States in the 1990s, and has two daughters.

== See also ==
- Russian 2022 war censorship laws
- Media freedom in Russia
- Human rights in Russia
- Anti-war movement
- Russian Americans
- Ksenia Karelina
- List of American people imprisoned in Russia
