= Lilia Chanysheva =

Russian auditor and politician (born 1982)

- Лилия Чанышева
- Born: 6 February 1982 (age 44); Ufa, Bashkir ASSR, Soviet Union
- Education: Financial University under the Government of the Russian Federation
- Occupation: Auditor
- Known for: Opposition to Vladimir Putin
- Political party: Progress Party (since 2013)
- Spouse: Almaz Gatin

Lilia Ayratovna Chanysheva (Russian: Лилия Айратовна Чанышева, Bashkir: Лилиә Айрат ҡыҙы Чанышева, romanized: Liliä Ayrat qıźı Çanışeva, Tatar: Лилия Айрат кызы Чанышева, romanized: Liliä Ayrat qızı Çanışeva; born 6 February 1982) is a Russian auditor, opposition politician and former leading associate of opposition leader Alexei Navalny. On 14 June 2023 Chanysheva was sentenced to 7½ years in prison on extremism-related charges, in May 2024 two years were added to her prison term.

On 1 August 2024, Chanysheva was released as one of 26 total prisoners swapped in the 2024 Ankara prisoner exchange, being a part of the largest prisoner exchange in post-Cold War history.

== Career ==
Chanysheva is a graduate of the Financial University under the Government of the Russian Federation, one of the leading financial universities in Russia. She worked at international accounting firms PricewaterhouseCoopers and Deloitte in Moscow. When Deloitte opened an office in Ufa, she returned to Bashkortostan.

Chanysheva has been an activist since 2013. In Ufa, she demanded proper fulfilment of their duties from the local authorities. And in September 2016, already a member of the unregistered liberal ‘Party of Progress’ created by Alexei Navalny's supporters, she went as an observer to the Kurultai elections. A scandal erupted when she videotaped violations at her polling station and demanded that regulations of the voting law were respected. In 2017, she started to run the regional branch of Navalny's Anti-Corruption Foundation in Ufa. In May 2019, she registered for public hearings on budget implementation for the previous period. At the meeting, Chanysheva accused present officials of lying and unreasonable spending of budget funds. The video with her offering the officials to ‘steal less and eat less’ went viral. The activist was forcibly removed from the meeting by security. She was a vocal public critic of Radiy Khabirov, head of the Republic of Bashkortostan, exposing in her articles his luxurious lifestyle and the wealth of his wife.

Chanysheva was the unofficial leader of protests against a limestone mining project at Kushtau mountain, she was detained many times when participating in manifestations and demonstrations.

In early 2021, when Navalny's Foundation for Fighting Corruption (FBK) was declared an "extremist organization", Chanysheva announced leaving politics to concentrate on her family.

== Arrest and prosecution ==
In November 2021, Chanysheva was arrested amid a wider crackdown on Navalny's political network. Retroactively, extremism charges were introduced against her. On 14 June 2023 she was sentenced to 7½ years in prison on extremism-related charges. The court also ordered her to pay a fine of 400,000 rubles (approximately $4,760). The trial was classified as secret.

On 4 April 2024, Bashkortostan’s Supreme Court added two more years to Chanysheva's prison term. In May 2024, Chanysheva wrote an open letter to Vladimir Putin, asking to be pardoned.

== Release ==
On 1 August 2024, Chanysheva was released as one of 26 total prisoners swapped in the 2024 Ankara prisoner exchange, being a part of the largest prisoner exchange in post-Cold War history.

== Recognition ==
In December 2024, Lilia Chanysheva was included on the BBC's 100 Women list.
