= Detention of Kevin Lick =

Case of Russian-German political prisoner

- Born: 10 May 2005; Montabaur, Germany
- Occupation: student
- Criminal charges: state treason
- Criminal penalty: 4 years in prison
- Criminal status: released
- Parents: Viktor Lik (father); Victoria Lik (mother)

In February 2023, Russian authorities detained 17-year-old Kevin Lick on charges of state treason. Kevin was one of 16 foreign nationals and political prisoners who were extradited during an exchange for Russian convicts between the West, and the youngest person in Russia to be convicted of state treason.

== Biography ==
He was born on 10 May 2005 in Montabaur, Germany, one hundred kilometers from Cologne. His mother Victoria married Russian German Viktor Lik and moved to Germany pregnant. After his parents divorced, Lick received German citizenship from his father. Victoria and Kevin spent every two years vacationing in the Republic of Adygea, and returned for good in 2017. At the age of 12, Kevin enrolled in Maikop Secondary School No. 17 of Social Development and Success. Later he studied at the Republican Natural and Mathematical School at Adygeya State University, and won four times in German language Olympiads.

== Criminal proceedings ==
=== Detention ===
In February 2023, Lick was detained at Sochi airport, from where he and his mother were about to fly to Germany. At the time of his detention, Kevin was 17 years old.

=== Prosecution and trial ===
According to the FSB version, from 23 December 2021 to 8 February 2023, Kevin "carried out visual surveillance" and took photos in Maikop of "locations of deployment" of a Russian military unit. He sent the photos to the e-mail account of a "representative of a foreign state." According to him, he took the photos for personal use, but FSB officers wrote in his testimony that he allegedly intended to pass the photos to German intelligence services. Kevin Lick believes that the case against him was started to replenish the exchange fund. In December 2023, the Supreme Court of Adygea sentenced Lick to four years in prison. Lick was sentenced to a term below the minimum stipulated by the article on state treason. The court considered the defendant's age as mitigating circumstances, as well as “confession of guilt”, “active contribution to the detection and investigation”, chronic diseases and “multiple victories at various Olympiads”.

=== Exchange ===
On 1 August 2024, an exchange of political prisoners took place between Russia and the West, Russia released and handed over 16 people, including Kevin. Shortly before the exchange, a number of media outlets reported that Lick had gone missing from the colony. This was discovered by Lick's mother when she was going to deliver food to him, and other convicts also began to disappear from the colony, but the authorities did not comment on the preparations for the exchange.

== Aftermath ==
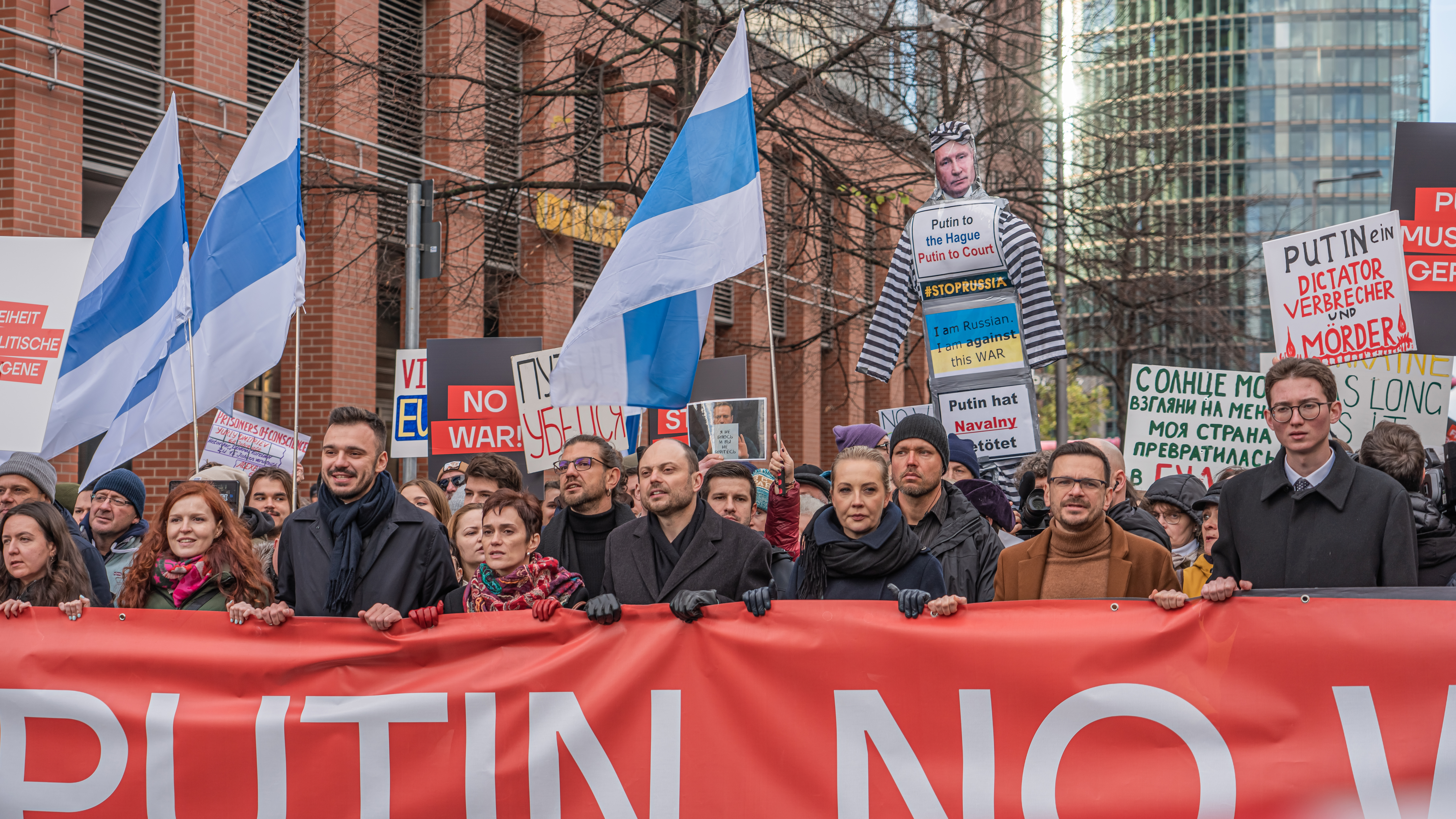
Kevin Lick (right) with Vladimir Kara-Murza, Ilya Yashin and Yulia Navalnaya at an anti-war protest in Berlin, 17 November 2024

On November 17, 2024, Kevin Lick took part in an anti-war march in Berlin, which also included Ilya Yashin and Vladimir Kara-Murza, who were released during the exchange.

On September 5, 2025, Kevin Lick has acknowledged in a post on Telegram that he indeed tried to transfer the photos to the German government.

== See also ==
- 2024 Ankara prisoner exchange
- Human rights in Russia
- Russian 2022 war censorship laws
