= Post Isolation Support Activities =

U.S. program to support former hostages

Post Isolation Support Activities (PISA) is a 10-day optional program offered by United States Army South at the Brooke Army Medical Center in San Antonio, Texas, designed to aid wrongfully detained and imprisoned Americans in decompressing from their experiences and readjusting to civilian life. The program includes initial physical and psychological evaluations, followed by therapeutic decompression led by SERE-trained doctors.

== Description ==
Post Isolation Support Activities (PISA) is a 10-day optional program run by United States Army South of the U.S. Department of Defense (DoD) at the Brooke Army Medical Center at Joint Base San Antonio-Fort Sam Houston in San Antonio, Texas, that helps wrongful detained and imprisoned Americans decompress from their detention and readjust to regular life after being freed. Former hostages and their families usually fly to PISA shortly after arriving back in the United States.

On the first day, ex-captives undergo a battery of physical, then psychological tests and evaluations in a restricted area of the base's hospital. They then start decompression with doctors trained in Survival, Evasion, Resistance and Escape (SERE) training. Staff and doctors start to give the former hostages predictability and control, which they lacked in captivity. At the end of the 10 days, attendees share their experiences with the program's doctors to capture lessons learned. They are not required to attend the full 10 days, and may also elect to undergo a follow-on 10-day program in North Carolina.

PISA began as a nascent program at a DoD facility in Germany.

== Notable program attendees ==
- Citgo 6
- Evan Gershkovich
- Paul Whelan
- Alsu Kurmasheva
- Brittney Griner
- Trevor Reed
