= BTC-e =

Cryptocurrency trading platform

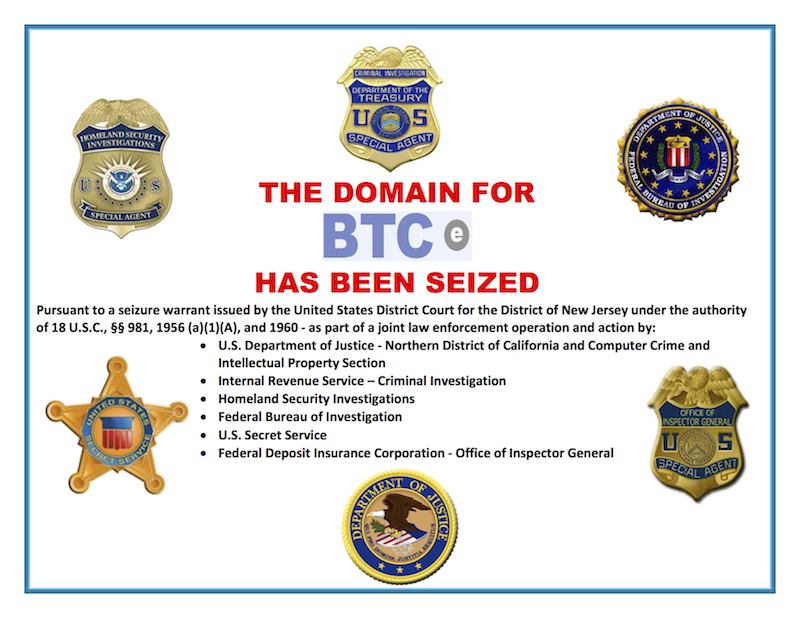
- BTC-e Domain Seized by U.S. Law Enforcement
- Industry: Cryptocurrency exchange
- Founded: 2011
- Headquarters: Russia
- Website: btc-e.com

BTC-e was a cryptocurrency exchange primarily serving the Russian market, with servers located in the United States. The U.S. government seized their website and funds in 2017. It was founded in July 2011 by Alexander Vinnik and Aleksandr Bilyuchenko, and as of February 2015 handled around 3% of all Bitcoin exchange volume. The platform was eventually taken over by Russian Orthodox oligarch Konstantin Malofeev, and funds from BTC-e were used for the war in Donbas, under the control of the FSB.

It was a component of the CoinDesk Bitcoin Price Index since the index's September 2013 formation.

BTC-e was operated by Always Efficient LLP, which was registered in London and was listed as having two officers (Sandra Gina Esparon and Evaline Sophie Joubert) and two people with significant control: Alexander Buyanov and Andrii Shvets.

The US Justice Department attempted to close down BTC-e on 26 July 2017, when they charged Vinnik and BTC-e in a 21-count indictment for operating an alleged international money laundering scheme and allegedly laundering funds from the hack of Japan-based bitcoin exchange Mt. Gox.

== History ==
BTC-e was established in July 2011, handling a few coin pairs, including Bitcoin/U.S. dollar and I0Coin to Bitcoin. By October 2011, they supported many different currency pairs, including Litecoin to dollars, Bitcoin to rubles and RuCoin to rubles.

The BTC-e website went offline on 25 July 2017, following the arrest of BTC-e staff members and the seizure of server equipment at one of their data centres. These events led to the closure of the BTC-e service.

To repay its customers, BTC-e created WEX tokens, which were used to represent customers' seized equity until its funds were also seized by US Government. The WEX tokens represented $1 and were issued to account for the value of customers' cryptocurrencies at the time of the seizure. Alexander Vinnik was convicted and sentenced to 5 years in prison in France while refusing to testify during his trial. He was acquitted on involvement with the Locky ransomware charges. WEX exchange is ultimately controlled by FSB and managed by Konstantin Malofeev.

As of 2018, the WEX exchange was closed permanently.

== See also ==
- Economics of bitcoin
- List of cryptocurrency exchanges
- List of bitcoin companies
