= Marc Fogel =

American previously detained in Russia (born in 1961)

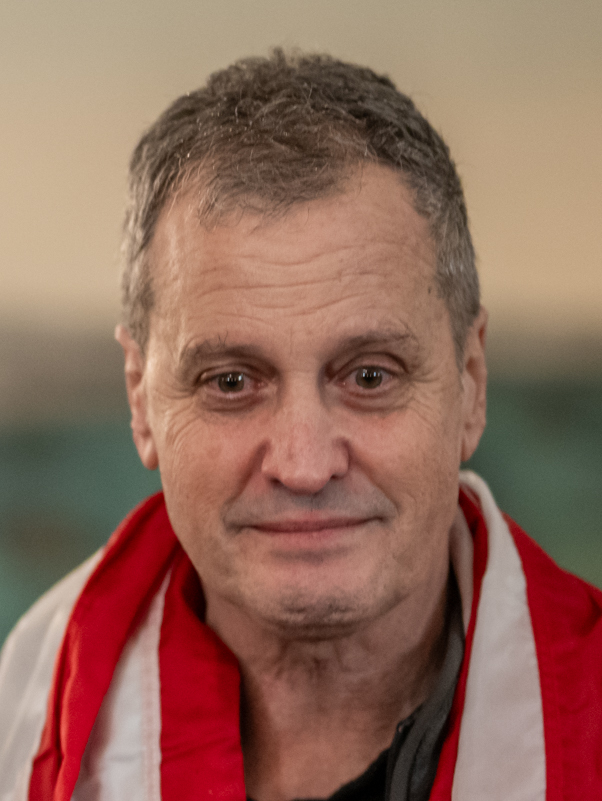
- Fogel in 2025
- Born: Marc Hilliard Fogel; July 28, 1961 (age 65); Butler, Pennsylvania, U.S.

Detainment
- Country: Russia
- Detained: August 15, 2021
- Conviction: Drug trafficking
- Sentence: 14 years in prison
- Time held: 3 years, 6 months, and 27 days
- Released: February 11, 2025

Marc Hilliard Fogel (born July 28, 1961) is an American schoolteacher who was arrested in August 2021 by Russian authorities for trying to enter Russia with 0.6 ounces (17 g) of medical cannabis. In June 2022, he was sentenced to 14 years in prison. He was released from Russia on February 11, 2025.

== Life and career ==
Fogel is from Pennsylvania, United States. He attended the Indiana University of Pennsylvania. He was a history teacher at international schools in Colombia, Malaysia, Oman, Mexico and Venezuela. He had lived and worked in Russia since 2012, teaching at the Anglo-American School of Moscow.

== Arrest and imprisonment ==
In August, 2021, Fogel entered Russia through customs at Sheremetyevo Airport when 17 grams of medical cannabis was found in his luggage. The substance had been prescribed to him in the United States to treat chronic pain, though cannabis of any form is entirely illegal in Russia. In June 2022, Fogel was convicted of drug trafficking and sentenced to 14 years in prison. In October 2022, he was transferred from a detention center in Moscow to a penal colony, where he would serve the remainder of his sentence. In August 2022, a bipartisan group of United States senators lobbied for the State Department to designate Fogel as wrongfully detained.

Fogel's family called on Brittney Griner (who was imprisoned on similar charges but released in a prisoner exchange in 2022) to speak out on his case. In 2022, following the Brittney Griner conversation, a petition was initiated on Change.org, calling for Fogel's freedom and urging the Biden administration to designate him as wrongfully detained. As of September 7, 2023, it had garnered 22,455 signatures out of its 25,000 signature goal.

Fogel was not part of the 2024 Russian prisoner exchange, though according to an American official there were ongoing conversations about his release. Fogel's family voiced their disappointment that Fogel had not been included in the exchange, implying his lack of notoriety to be the cause: "Marc has been unjustly detained for far too long and must be prioritized in any swap negotiations with Russia, regardless of his level of notoriety or celebrity."

On August 1, 2024, National Security Advisor Jake Sullivan described Fogel as wrongfully detained, the first time a U.S. official had done so. In 2024, a short documentary about Fogel's case titled Did You Forget Mr. Fogel? was released. On July 22, 2024, it was screened at the United States Capitol for Senators Bob Casey and John Fetterman, as well as Representatives Chris Deluzio, Mike Kelly, and Guy Reschenthaler. The documentary and its subsequent screenings were credited with significantly increasing public awareness of Fogel's imprisonment.

== Release from detainment ==
Fogel with President Donald Trump in February 2025

On February 11, 2025, Marc Fogel was released by Russian authorities following diplomatic negotiations, headed by President Donald Trump after serving 3 1/2 years in a Rybinsk prison. He departed Russia alongside Steve Witkoff, who had been involved in discussions regarding his release. U.S. Secretary of State, Marco Rubio, publicly confirmed Fogel's release in an official statement. Upon Fogel's arrival in the U.S., he was welcomed into the White House by President Donald Trump, who later announced that another prisoner release would be taking place the next day.

Fogel was released by Russia as part of a prisoner exchange for the Russian cybercriminal Alexander Vinnik, who was released by the U.S.

== See also ==
- List of Americans wrongfully imprisoned or detained abroad
- List of American people imprisoned in Russia
