= Alexander Vinnik =

Russian computer expert and convicted felon

- Александр Винник
- Born: August 16, 1979 (age 47); Kurgan, Kurgan Oblast, RSFSR, USSR
- Other name: Sasha WME
- Citizenship: Russian
- Known for: BTC-e
- Status: Repatriated to Russia
- Conviction: Money laundering
- Criminal charges: Money laundering, extortion, engaging in unlawful monetary transactions

Alexander Vinnik (Russian: Александр Винник) is a Russian entrepreneur, the co-founder of BTC-e cryptocurrency exchange.

He pleaded guilty for money laundering in the USA but returned to Russia as a part of an exchange for Marc Fogel (sentenced in Russia to 14 years in prison for attempting to enter the country with medical cannabis).

== BTC-e ==
Vinnik is alleged to have directed and supervised the operations and finances of the BTC-e cryptocurrency exchange from 2011 to 2017.

In 2020, the London-based cryptocurrency analysis firm Elliptic claimed that BTC-e may have been used by Fancy Bear during the 2015–2016 Democratic National Committee cyber attacks.

BTC-e assets were ultimately acquired by Konstantin Malofeev under the control of the FSB.

== Arrest, sentencing, extradition, detention, release ==
On July 25, 2017, Vinnik was arrested in Ouranoupoli, Greece at the request of the U.S. on suspicion of laundering $4 billion through the digital currency bitcoin (BTC-e). At the time, Vinnik denied the charges. In late July 2017, U.S. officials requested Vinnik's extradition from Greece. In early October 2017, his extradition was requested by the Prosecutor General of Russia.

In late June 2018, France requested his extradition, accusing him of fraud. In early July 2018, Russia submitted a new extradition request, reportedly based on a confession to additional hacking offenses. In November 2018, Vinnik went on a three-month hunger strike in protest of his detainment in Greece. In January 2020, Vinnik was extradited to France.

In June 2020, New Zealand Police announced the seizure of $90 million from WME Capital Management, a company in New Zealand registered to Vinnik. In December 2020, Vinnik was acquitted on involvement with the Locky ransomware charges, but was sentenced to five years in prison for money laundering.

On August 4, 2022, Vinnik was extradited from Greece to the United States to face charges of money laundering and operation of an unlicensed money service business in the US. On August 5, 2022, the United States Justice Department released a statement saying Vinnik's first appearance for the 21-count superseding indictment from January 2017 had been that morning at a federal court in California. In May 2024, Vinnik pleaded guilty to conspiracy to commit money laundering. Vinnik's lawyer, Arkady Bukh, stated that he pled guilty "on a restricted number of charges," and that as a result of the plea bargain Bukh now expected Vinnik to get a prison term of less than 10 years.

On February 12, 2025, the U.S. Government announced it was releasing Vinnik as part of an exchange with Russia for the imprisoned American schoolteacher Marc Fogel. Vinnik arrived in Russia the next day aboard a US Air Force special flight via Poland.
