= Sergey Vladimirovich Cherkasov =

Alleged Russian GRU operative convicted of forging Brazilian ID documents

- Born: 11 September 1985 (age 40)
- Other name: Victor Muller Ferreira
- Occupation: Alleged Russian intelligence officer (GRU)
- Known for: Attempted infiltration of the International Criminal Court under a false identity
- Criminal charges: Identity fraud, acting as an agent of a foreign power, visa fraud, bank fraud, wire fraud, drug trafficking (in Russia), money laundering
- Criminal penalty: 5 years and 2 months (Brazil, identity fraud)
- Criminal status: Imprisoned in Brazil
- Espionage activity
- Allegiance: Russia
- Agency: GRU

Sergey Vladimirovich Cherkasov (Russian: Сергей Владимирович Черкасов, Russian pronunciation: [ʂɪrˈɡʲej vlɐˈdʲimʲɪrəvʲɪt͡ɕ t͡ɕɪrˈkasəf]), also known as Victor Muller Ferreira (Brazilian Portuguese pronunciation: [ˈviktoɾ ˈmileɾ feˈʁejɾɐ]), is an alleged Russian intelligence officer working for the GRU, whose true identity was revealed by the Dutch General Intelligence and Security Service in 2022. He was first sentenced by a Brazilian federal court to 15 years in prison for using a forged Brazilian government-issued document, but the sentence was later reduced to 5 years and 2 months. As of January 2024, Cherkasov remained in prison, and Brazil had brought a new charge, that he had received and laundered money from a Russian diplomatic employee there, a charge that might forestall an early release from prison.

== Early life and education ==
Sergey Vladimirovich Cherkasov was born on 11 September 1985. Cherkasov first arrived in Brazil in 2010 under his real Russian name. After this, he managed to get legitimate Brazilian documents with a fake birth certificate under the name "Victor Muller Ferreira". He used the name of a fake father and the name of a deceased woman who actually didn't have any children in the fake birth certificate. Under that false identity, he managed to get Brazilian documents and a Brazilian passport, which he used to enter and leave Brazil with. He left and returned to Brazil 15 times from 2010 until 2022.

The Dutch Military Intelligence and Security Service published a document in broken Portuguese that they stated was his cover story. The document says that he went to Rio de Janeiro in August 2010 to meet his estranged father, whom he blamed for his problems, as well as for the deaths of his mother and his aunt. The document claimed he had forgotten his Portuguese, and asserted that he had moved to Brasília when he was supposedly 25 years old. He claimed he was in Brazil "to learn the language and restore my citizenship". Some details of this alleged background have been described as implausible. The document further mentions his having to visit Ireland to attend the funeral of his father.

Operating under his fake Brazilian identity, he is reported to have first earned a degree in political science from Trinity College Dublin (2014-2018), then "a masters at Johns Hopkins University in Baltimore, majoring in US foreign policy... in 2020" (in reporting from The Guardian, based on a posted curriculum vitae, and university records). Reporting from Ireland has suggested on the basis of "[m]ultiple sources" that Irish "J2 military intelligence" and "garda Crime and Security" operatives were aware of Cherkasov's activities as an agent, in his time there.

According to his Russian passport, he was registered as a resident of Kaliningrad exclave; public registry data showed he was a co-owner of a Kaliningrad construction firm at the age of 19. His real age at the time of his arrest in 2022 appears to be 36, while the age of his alias is 33.

== Attempt to infiltrate the International Criminal Court and discovery ==
In April 2022 he flew to the Netherlands to take up a position at the International Criminal Court in The Hague. The AIVD, the Netherlands' intelligence service, considered Cherkasov a threat to national security and then proceeded to alert the Dutch immigration and naturalization service about him. The Dutch intelligence agency said "The threat posed by this intelligence officer is deemed potentially very high". He was therefore detained at Schiphol Airport by Dutch immigration officials and prevented from entering the Netherlands. He was subsequently returned to Brazil. Upon arriving in Brazil, he was arrested for identity fraud.

At the time of his hiring, the ICC had begun to investigate war crimes committed by the Russian military in Ukraine. Had he managed to take his ICC position, he would have had access to the ICC emails and the document systems of the institution.

It is believed that a discovery made in 2018 in the poisoning of Sergei and Yulia Skripal case, where the Russian GRU suspects were found to have passport numbers that were close to each other, led to an investigation by many countries of historic Russian passport numbers. Cherkasov was discovered by the United States to have a close number, identified and tracked, leading to a tip off to the Dutch authorities.

== Aftermath of the discovery ==
One of Cherkasov's professors at Johns Hopkins, Eugene Finkel, expressed dismay at having provided him a letter of recommendation for his application to the International Criminal Court, and satisfaction that his dissembling had been exposed. Finkel tweeted that the alleged spy was a former student who had claimed "Brazilian/Irish roots" and who had asked him for a reference letter for his application to the ICC. Finkel tweeted "I wrote him a letter. A strong one, in fact. Yes, me. I wrote a reference letter for a GRU officer. I will never get over this fact. I hate everything about GRU, him, this story. I am so glad he was exposed."

Donnacha Ó Beacháin, a professor of politics in the School of Law & Government, Dublin City University, said it was not surprising that he was educated in Ireland, but it was, in fact, surprising that he was caught. He added "Essentially these are sleeper agents. The idea would be that - from a young age- they would build up a fake identity, and they would acquire different qualifications and credentials that would make them more plausible. Then they will be used to infiltrate Western organisations. Trinity College would be a very credible university based in a friendly western country. So from that perspective, placing an operative in Trinity and giving them a background there would be something that can be utilised later."

== Conviction and extradition request ==
He was first sentenced by a Brazilian federal court to 15 years in prison for using a forged Brazilian government-issued document, but the sentence was later reduced to 5 years and 2 months. In July 2023, Brazilian authorities have declined a US request to extradite him, saying that he would eventually be sent to Russia instead. In a statement, the Brazilian Ministry of Justice and Public Security said that the Federal Supreme Court approved a request by Russia to extradite him to Russia on 17 March 2023, where he is accused of “drug trafficking,” according to Russian state-run news agency TASS. In the United States, he was charged on March 24, 2023 for acting as an agent of a foreign power, visa fraud, bank fraud, wire fraud, and other charges stemming from his alleged illegal activities in the United States.

== Money laundering charge ==
In January 2024, Brazil brought a new charge against Cherkasov, with the accusation that he had received and laundered money from Ivan Chetverikov, a Russian diplomatic employee at a mission in Brazil; the charge reportedly will prevent Cherkasov's eligibility for early release from imprisonment on his earlier conviction.
