= Rebecca Vincent =

American-British human rights campaigner

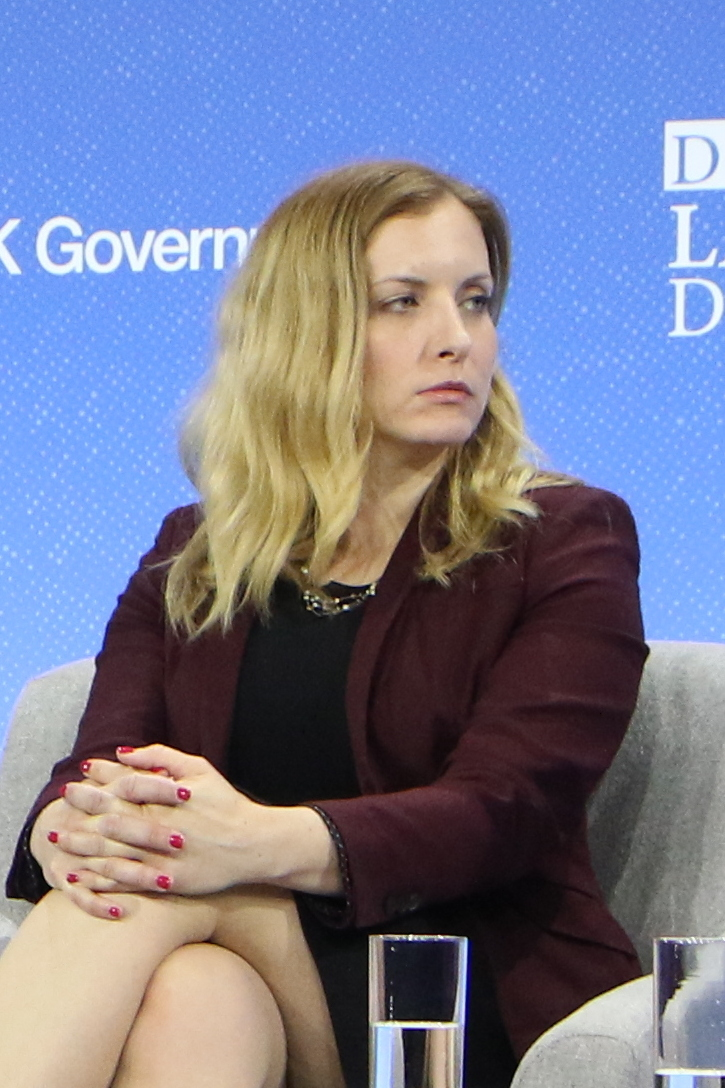
- Born: April 28, 1983 (age 43)
- Occupation: Human Rights Campaigner
- Employer: Reporters Without Borders

Rebecca Vincent (born 1983) is an American-British human rights campaigner who is currently the Director of Insights and Innovation at the Thomson Reuters Foundation. She was previously the Director of Campaigns for Reporters Without Borders.

== Career ==
=== Early career ===
Vincent began her career with the U.S. Department of State, which she joined in 2005, immediately after completing her bachelor's degree in political science from the University of North Texas. From 2006 to 2008, Vincent was posted to the US Embassy in Baku, Azerbaijan, as a political officer covering the democracy and human rights portfolios. Vincent also spent time as a political reporting officer at the US Mission to the United Nations in New York in 2008, covering proceedings of the 63rd General Assembly and the Third (Social, Humanitarian, and Cultural) Committee.

=== Human rights campaigner ===
After leaving the State Department, Vincent completed an MA in Human Rights at the University College London. She then worked with Article 19 as the coordinator of the International Partnership Group for Azerbaijan, a coalition of 20 international organisations which came together in 2010 to join their efforts to promote and protect freedom of expression and media development in Azerbaijan.

In 2012, the Azerbaijani Government banned Vincent from the country after she helped launch the Art for Democracy campaign, which sought to use all forms of artistic expression to promote democracy and human rights in Azerbaijan. Campaign staff and supporters were subjected to a number of forms of pressure by the Azerbaijani authorities following the revocation of Vincent's residence permit.

After her expulsion from the country, Vincent continued to work on human rights issues in Azerbaijan, building up campaigns for the releases of jailed human rights defenders and journalists in the country, including Rasul Jafarov and Khadija Ismayilova. Vincent coordinated the Sport for Rights campaign, which worked to raise awareness of the human rights situation in Azerbaijan around the Baku 2015 European Games and the 2016 Formula One Grand Prix. Vincent organised a series of 40 parallel protests to mark Khadija Ismayilova's 40th birthday shortly before Ismayilova's release from prison in May 2016.

In 2016, Vincent joined Reporters Without Borders to open and run its London bureau. In June 2020, she was appointed to the new global role of Director of Campaigns. Vincent led the organisation's campaigning in the cases of Daphne Caruana Galizia, Christopher Allen, Julian Assange, Jimmy Lai, and others. She was a founding member of the steering committee of the Hold the Line Coalition, which was launched to campaign in support of Maria Ressa and independent media in the Philippines, and the Free Narges Coalition, which was launched to campaign for the release of Nobel Peace Prize laureate Narges Mohammadi from prison and wider human rights protections in Iran.

Vincent faced extensive barriers in monitoring extradition proceedings against Julian Assange in London courts. In April 2023, Vincent and Reporters Without Borders' Secretary-General Christophe Deloire were barred access from Belmarsh Prison, where they attempted to visit Assange. They later gained access and Vincent visited Assange in prison six times before his release in June 2024.

In 2025, Vincent took up the post of Interim Director of Big Brother Watch, a UK civil liberties organisation that campaigns for privacy rights and free speech. She has campaigned against the use of live facial recognition, advocated for the protection of encryption in the UK government's case against Apple, and has been an outspoken critic of proposals for the introduction of a mandatory digital ID.

In 2026, Vincent joined the Thomson Reuters Foundation as Director of Insights & Innovation.

Vincent is a member of the Magnitsky Human Rights Awards Committee and the Advisory Council of the Foreign Policy Centre.
