= Andrei Pivovarov =

Russian political activist

- Андрей Пивоваров
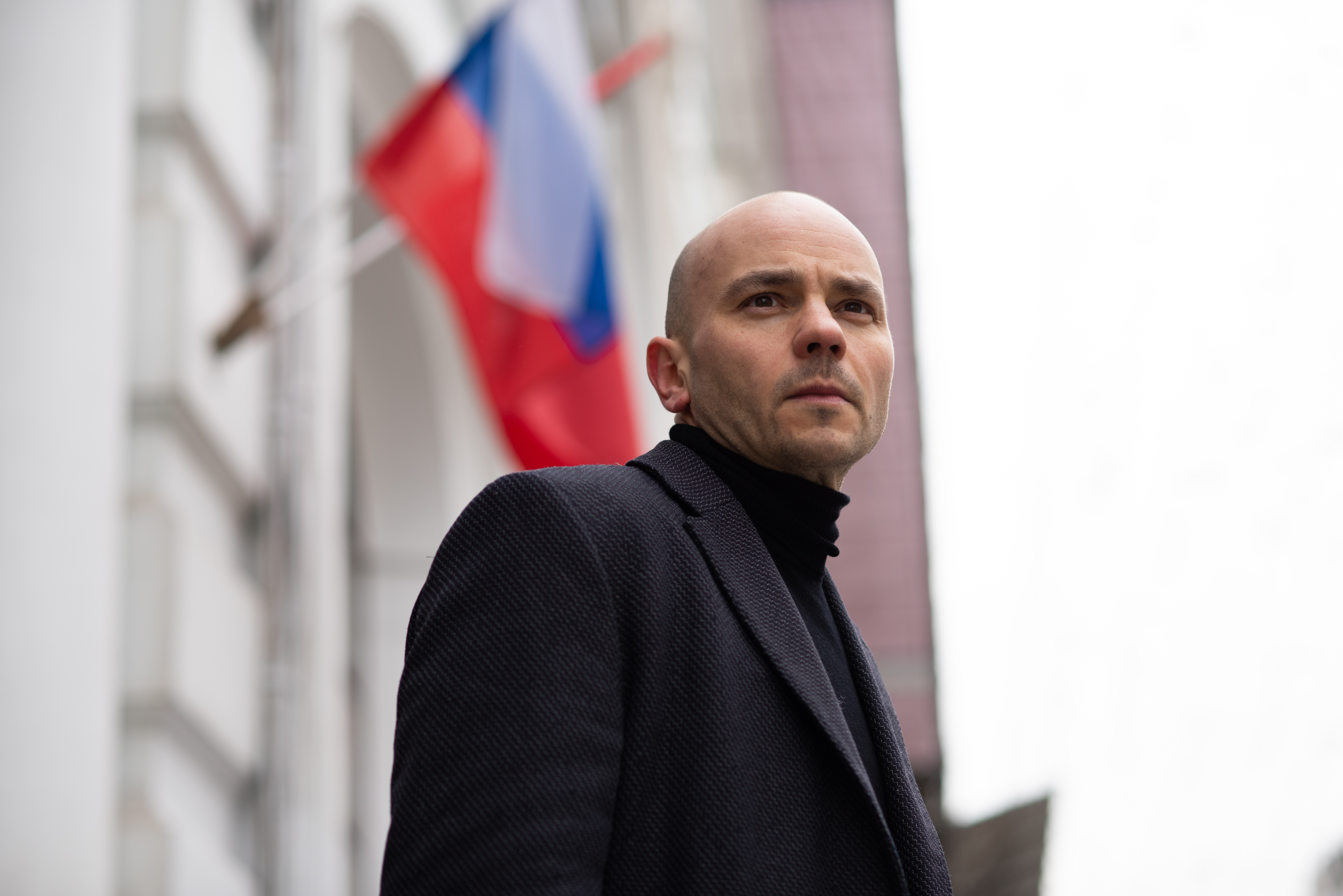
- Pivovarov in 2021
- Born: 23 September 1981; Leningrad, Russian SFSR, Soviet Union
- Citizenship: Russian
- Education: Saint Petersburg State University
- Occupation: civil rights activist
- Political party: Union of Right Forces; PARNAS
- Movement: the Russian opposition movement

Andrei Sergeyevich Pivovarov (Russian: Андрей Сергеевич Пивоваров; born 23 September 1981) is a Russian political activist, formerly incarcerated on charges of carrying out activities for an undesirable organisation. He formerly served as director of Open Russia. The Memorial Human Rights Center has deemed him a political prisoner. From 22 October 2012 to 19 October 2013 he was a member of the Russian Opposition Coordination Council.

He was released on 1 August 2024 as part of a prisoner exchange that included 25 other prisoners.

== Biography ==
Pivovarov was born on 23 September 1981, in Leningrad, in the Soviet Union. He earned a degree in economics at the Saint Petersburg State University. In 2004, he joined the liberal-conservative Union of Right Forces political party. In 2010, he was involved with the Strategy-31 movement, which held civic protests without obtaining legal permission in support of the right to peaceful assembly, as a local organiser. As a result of his participation in the movement, he was arrested and sentenced to 30 days incarceration.

In 2011, he joined the People's Freedom Party "For Russia without Lawlessness and Corruption" (PARNAS). In mid-2015, he served as a campaign manager for PARNAS in the Kostroma Oblast. On 21 July that year, he published a statement on social media network VK celebrating that the party had obtained enough signatures to be on the ballot for the 2016 Russian legislative election and saying that the party had been able to ensure that the signatures were legitimate. Eight days later, he was arrested and charged with having bribed a local police officer to illegally gain access to the government's voter database so that he could verify the signatures. Pivovarov's mother's home was also raided by police.

In 2014, he joined the newly relaunched Open Russia as a local organiser in Saint Petersburg. In March 2015, ahead of an Open Russia-hosted lecture by Stanislav Belkovsky, the tires of Pivovarov's car were slashed. In August 2020, he and two other members of Open Russia were detained at the Russian border after attempting to travel to Belarus to act as observers in the 2020 Belarusian presidential election. In September 2020, he was arrested and sentenced to 14 days incarceration on charges of organising a public event without giving notice after having made a Facebook post in July that year calling for signatures on a petition opposing the amendments proposed in the 2020 Russian constitutional referendum. He was arrested again immediately after being released from that 14-day sentence.

In March 2021, he was charged with carrying out the activities of an undesirable organisation for Open Russia's role in organising the Moscow Congress of Municipal Deputies. In April 2021, he was faced similar charges after Open Russia distrusted personal protective equipment to an ambulance station in Saint Petersburg. In May 2021, four days after Open Russia disbanded, a flight from Saint Petersburg to Warsaw that Pivovarov was on was halted by police before it could take off. Pivovarov was subsequently taken off the flight, arrested, and charged with carrying out activities of an undesirable organisation for having shared information on Facebook during the 2020 Russian regional elections in support of Democratic Choice of Russia – United Democrats and former Open Russia Krasnodar chair Yana Antonova. Police also searched his home as well as those of several other Open Russia members in connection to his arrest without first obtaining a warrant. The European External Action Service condemned the arrest, saying that it was "not an isolated incident but confirms a continuous pattern of shrinking space for civil society, the opposition and critical voices as well as independent media."

In July 2022, he was sentenced to four years incarceration. Amnesty International condemned the sentence, saying that Pivovarov "has committed no internationally recognized crime and has been jailed for exercising his rights to freedom of expression and association."

In February 2023 it was published that he was transferred to Penal Colony No. 7 (Russian: ФКУ «ИК № 7 УФСИН России по РК») in Segezha, Republic of Karelia.

He was released on 1 August 2024 as part of a prisoner exchange.
