= Mikhail Mikushin =

Suspected Russian agent

- Михаил Микушин
- Born: Mikhail Valeryevich Mikushin; August 19, 1978 (age 48); Sverdlovsk, Russian SFSR, Soviet Union (now Yekaterinburg, Russia)
- Other name: José Assis Giammaria (cover name)
- Citizenship: Russia; Brazil (since 2006)
- Education: Master in strategic studies, bachelor in international relations
- Scientific career
- Workplaces: Centre for Military, Security and Strategic Studies, University of Tromsø

Mikhail Valeryevich Mikushin (Russian: Михаи́л Вале́рьевич Мику́шин; born 19 August 1978) is a Russian intelligence agent who, posing as a scientist, was arrested in October 2022 in Norway on spy charges against Norway.

Mikushin had an internship at University of Tromsø and posed as a Brazilian researcher named José Assis Giammaria. He was later revealed to have been a Russian citizen.

He was released to Russia in August 2024 as part of a 26-person prisoner exchange.

== Background ==
Mikushin has a bachelor's degree in political science with a focus on international relations at the Centre for Military, Security and Strategic Studies in Canada. He also has a master's degree from the University of Calgary.

In the autumn of 2021, he came to Norway as a visiting researcher where he worked at Centre for Peace Studies at UiT, dealing with topics such as social security, preparedness and hybrid threats.

== Espionage case ==
On 20 October 2022, the Ministry of Justice and Public Security sent a warning about the Brazilian visiting researcher José Assis Giammaria who worked at UiT, in which they believed that he was a "threat to fundamental national interests".

On 24 October, Mikushin was arrested by the Norwegian Police Security Service (PST), and the following day he was brought before the Nord-Troms and Senja District Court, where the PST believed that he was an illegalist who worked for the Russian intelligence service and asked for deportation from Norway.

On 28 October, the Oslo District Court decided to remand him for four weeks, subject to a ban on letters and visits for the entire period of imprisonment and complete isolation for two weeks. On 25 November, Mikushin was remanded in custody for another four weeks.

The Russian embassy in Oslo maintained that they did not know the researcher and would not comment on the charge. In November 2022, it became known that Brazilian authorities were investigating the researcher and were considering requesting his extradition.

In December 2023, the researcher stated that his real name is Mikhail Valeryevich Mikushin and that he is a Russian citizen.

== Connection to Russian intelligence ==
Early in the investigation, PST believed that the researcher was a Russian citizen whose real name was Mikhail Valerievich Mikushin, born on 19 August 1978 in Russia, and who was working on behalf of Russian intelligence.

According to Bellingcat, Mikushin is a colonel in the Russian intelligence service GRU.

== Charge and prisoner exchange ==
On 28 October 2022, Mikushin was first charged by the PST with violating Section 121 of the Norwegian Penal Code on "Intelligence-gathering activity targeting state secrets" and Section 126b of the Criminal Code, which deals with illegal intelligence that may harm other states' security interests. In December 2022, the charge was changed to a violation of Section 122 of the penal code (aggravated intelligence-gathering activity targeting state secrets).

In April 2024, PST had finished the investigation and forwarded it to the National Authority for Prosecution of Organised and other Serious Crime for assessment of charges.

=== Exchange ===
On 1 August 2024, Prime Minister Jonas Gahr Støre confirmed that Mikushin was part of a larger prisoner exchange between Russia and the West, coordinated by the Turkish security service. Foreign Minister Espen Barth Eide stated that this is, in practice, the closest one gets to an official confirmation that he is actually a Russian intelligence officer and not a Brazilian researcher, as he has originally claimed to be.
