= Ilya Yashin =

Russian activist, political prisoner and liberal politician (born 1983)

- Илья Яшин
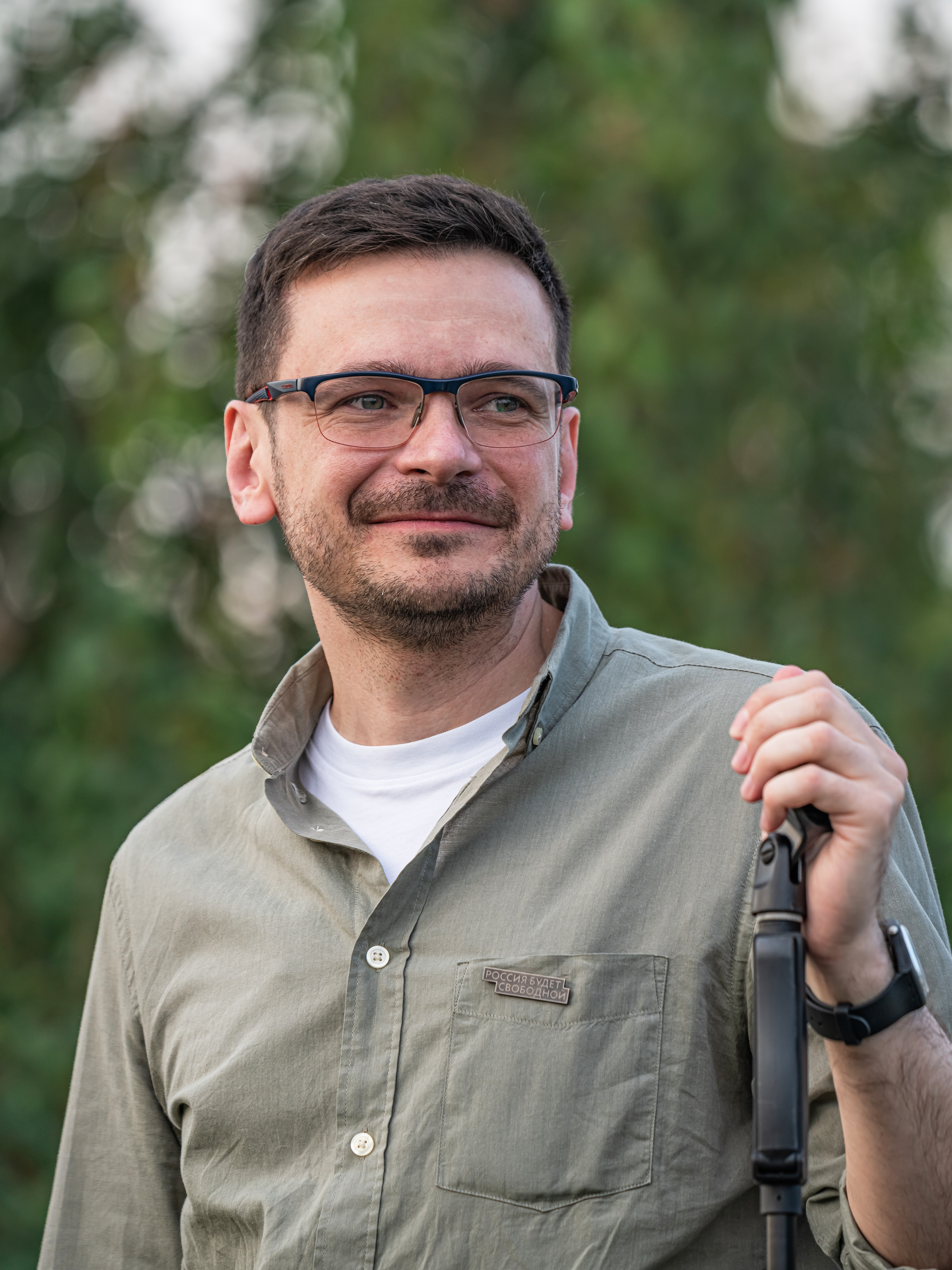
- Yashin in 2024

Chairman of the Council of Deputies of Krasnoselsky district
- In office 7 October 2017 – 27 July 2021

Member of the Council of Deputies of Krasnoselsky district
- In office 7 October 2017 – 11 September 2022

Leader of PARNAS
- In office 2012–2016

Personal details
- Born: 29 June 1983 (age 43) Moscow, Russian SFSR, Soviet Union
- Party: Independent (2008–2010, 2016-2026); Yabloko (2000–2008); PARNAS (2010–2016); Peaceful Russia (since 2026)
- Other political affiliations: Solidarnost (since 2008)
- Education: International Independent University of Environmental and Political Sciences, graduate school of the National Research University – Higher School of Economics
- Website: Yashin's mayoral campaign

Ilya Valeryevich Yashin (Russian: Илья Валерьевич Яшин; born 29 June 1983) is a Russian opposition politician who led the People's Freedom Party (PARNAS) from 2012 to 2016, and then its Moscow branch. He was also head of the Moscow municipal district of Krasnoselsky and former chairman of the Council of Deputies of the Krasnoselsky district from 2017 to 2021.

Yashin co-founded the civic youth movement Oborona in 2005 and later the political movement Solidarnost in 2008, of which he is still one of the leaders. He was an active participant in the Dissenters' March and the 2011–2013 Russian protests. In 2012, he was elected to the Russian Opposition Coordination Council. Amidst an increase in government crackdowns on the opposition following the 2022 Russian invasion of Ukraine, some considered Yashin to have had the largest platform of any opposition politician that had not either left the country, been imprisoned, or been killed. In June 2022, he was arrested, and later accused under the new war censorship laws of disseminating fake news about the Armed Forces. In December 2022, he was sentenced to 8 1/2 years in prison. Yashin was freed in August 2024 as part of the 2024 Ankara prisoner exchange.

On 8 September 2025, the Ministry of Internal Affairs of Russia declared Yashin a stateless person.

== Biography ==
=== Early life and education ===
Ilya Yashin was born in a Russian family in Moscow on 29 July 1983. After graduating from a comprehensive school with advanced study of Russian language and literature and an art school, in 2000 he entered He graduated from the International Independent University of Environmental and Political Sciences, the Faculty of Political Science. In 2005 he defended his thesis «Technologies of protest organization in modern Russia». From 2007, Yashin studied at the Department of Applied Political Science at the Graduate School of Economics.

=== Political career ===
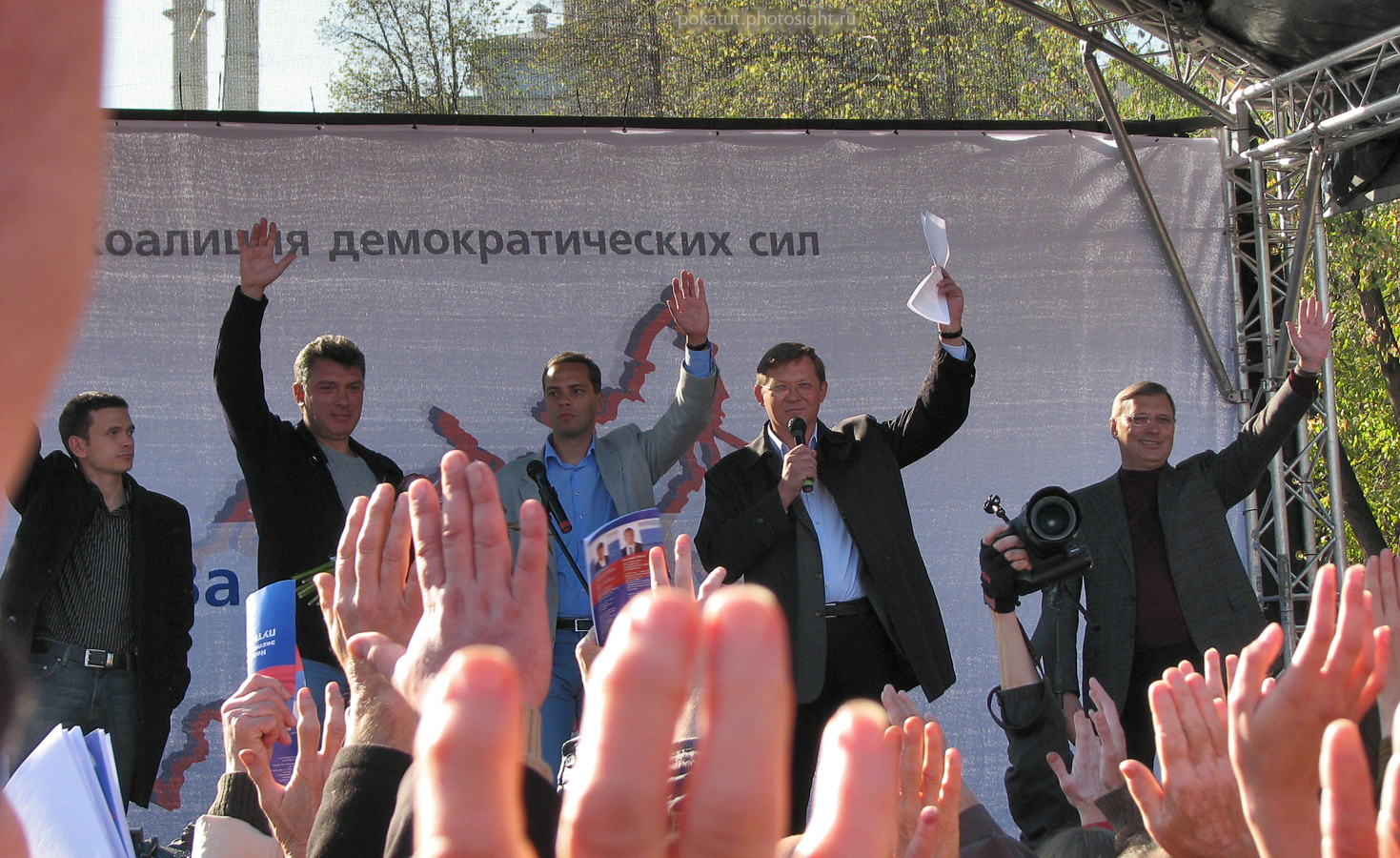
Yashin at an opposition rally with Boris Nemtsov, Vladimir Milov, Vladimir Ryzhkov and Mikhail Kasyanov on 9 October 2010

He served as the leader of the Yabloko party's youth wing since 2001 until 2008, organizing mass protests and speaking to the media about their causes. However, when he became an active member of Solidarnost in 2008, Yabloko expelled him for "causing political damage". Yashin ran for Moscow parliament in 2005 where he later became a close associate of Boris Nemtsov.

After joining Solidarity, Yashin was elected to the movement's Federal Political Council and Bureau, along with Boris Nemtsov, Garry Kasparov and other prominent opposition figures, followed by members of the SPS and the United Civil Front.

In the spring of 2009, Yashin headed Nemtsov's headquarters in the Sochi mayoral election. According to the voting results, Nemtsov received 13.6% of the vote, Yashin reported large-scale fraud in early voting and home voting, ballot stuffing at polling stations and pressure on observers, but even the official result was called high enough.

In July of the same year, Solidarity nominated Yashin among other candidates in the Moscow City Duma elections, however, the election commission recognized 100% of the signatures collected in his support as defective. The reason was the alleged inconsistency of the form of the signature sheet with the current legislation. Yashin was removed from the election. Subsequently, other Solidarity representatives were also denied registration.

Yashin is known for making passionate speeches at opposition rallies. He is an active participant in the Strategy-31 campaign for freedom of assembly. In 2005, he spoke against the Nashi movement, which supports President Vladimir Putin.

As a member of the Solidarity movement, he took part in anti-government rallies in Kaliningrad in January and August 2010. On 31 December 2010, Yashin was arrested for demonstrating in Moscow at another rally for Strategy-31. He was taken to a police station and detained for fifteen days. He claims evidence was then fabricated against him by the police. Amnesty International declared him a prisoner of conscience, along with Boris Nemtsov and Konstantin Kosiakin.

On 5 December 2011, Yashin and oppositionist Alexei Navalny led an unsanctioned march to Lubyanka Square, where they were detained by police. Yashin also organized and participated in rallies on 10 and 24 December 2011, 4 February and 5 March 2012. In February 2012, Yashin and a group of activists hung a 140-meter banner with the words "Putin, go away" on Sofia Embankment in front of the Kremlin, which took police officers more than an hour to take down.

On 22 October 2012, Yashin won 5th place in the elections to the Russian Opposition Coordination Council, collecting 32.4 thousand votes in his support, and became a member of the Council. The council was designed as a legitimate body to coordinate the actions of opposition forces and put forward political demands, and the term of office of the council members was limited to 1 year. By the end of that year, many participants left the association, while others became disillusioned and refused to continue their work.

Following the alleged kidnapping and torture of opposition activist Leonid Razvozzhayev, from Kyiv, Ukraine, Yashin was arrested on 27 October 2012 along with Sergei Udaltsov and Alexei Navalny while attempting to join a Moscow protest on Razvozzhayev's behalf. The three were charged with violating public order, for which they could be fined up to 30,000 rubles (US$1,000) or given 50 hours of community service.

On 23 February 2016 Yashin, despite harassment by police and hecklers, presented a report criticizing Chechen leader Ramzan Kadyrov, labeling him a danger to Russian national security and called for his resignation. The report highlighted Kadyrov's encouragement of violence against opposition activists and federal law enforcement officials, his luxurious lifestyle and corruption, and the building of a personal army.

=== Moscow municipal deputy ===
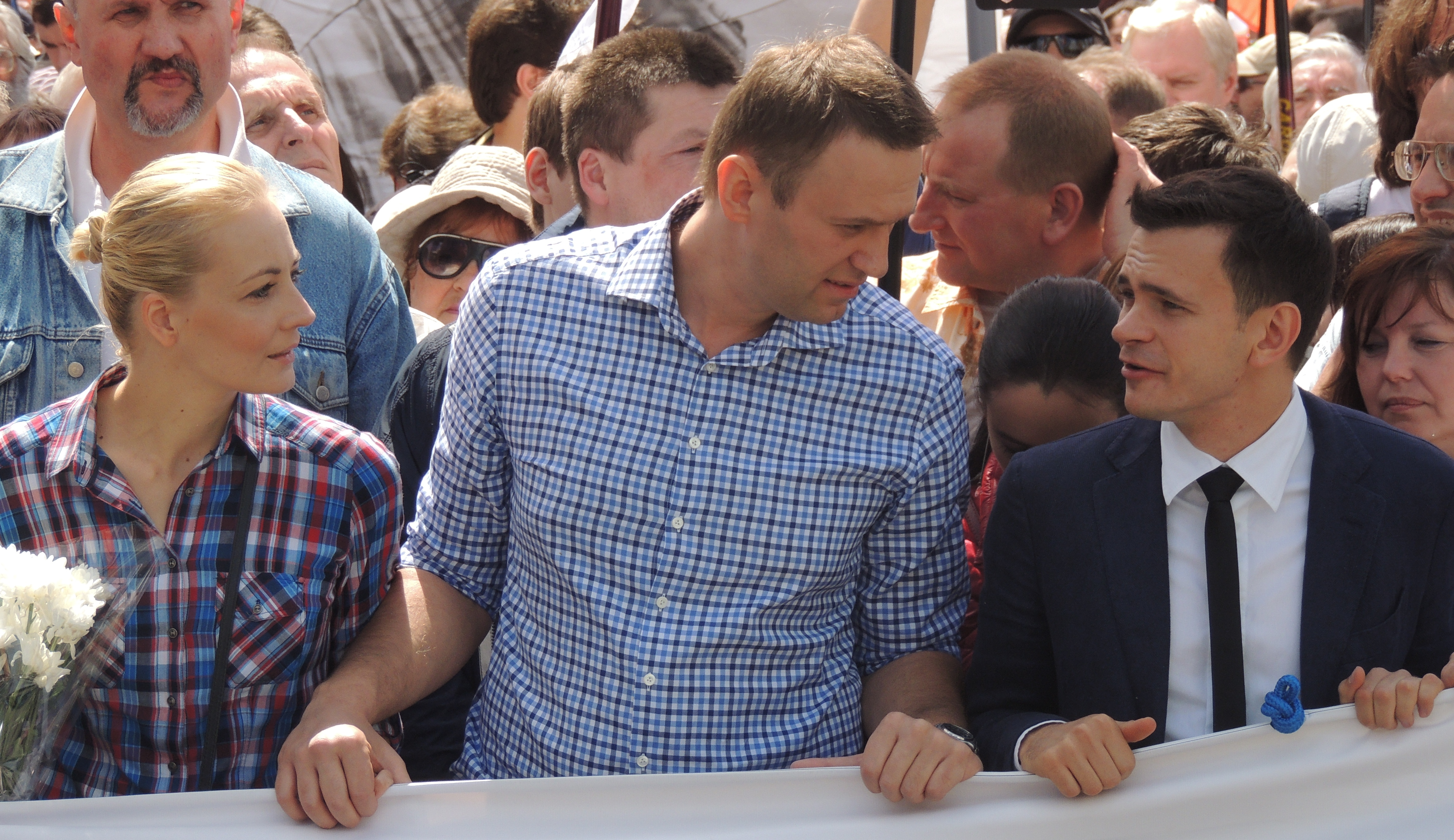
Alexei Navalny, his wife Yulia and Ilya Yashin at Moscow opposition rally on 12 June 2013

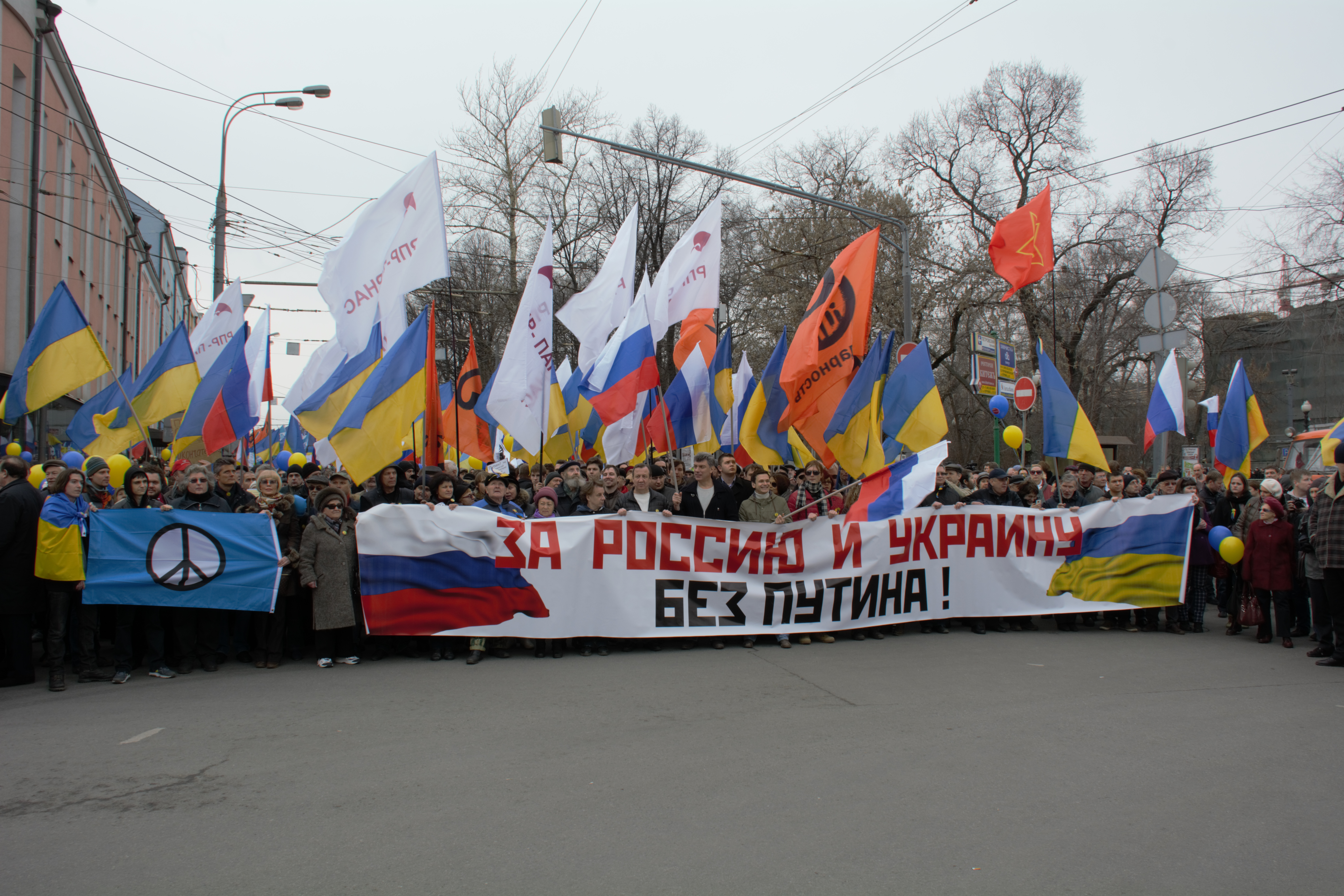
Boris Nemtsov and Ilya Yashin at a protest against Russia's annexation of Crimea on 15 March 2014

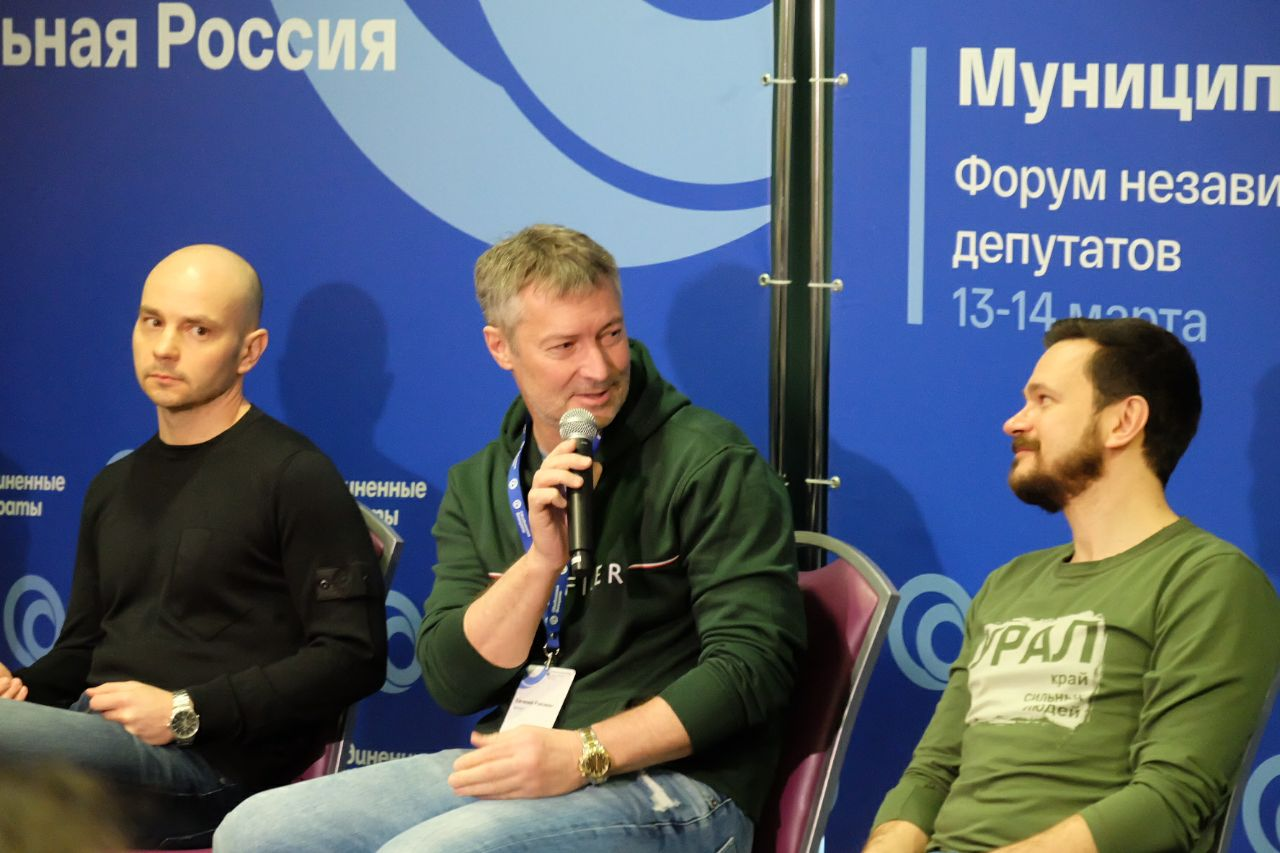
Yashin with Andrei Pivovarov and Yevgeny Roizman at the "Municipal Russia" forum in Moscow on 13 March 2021

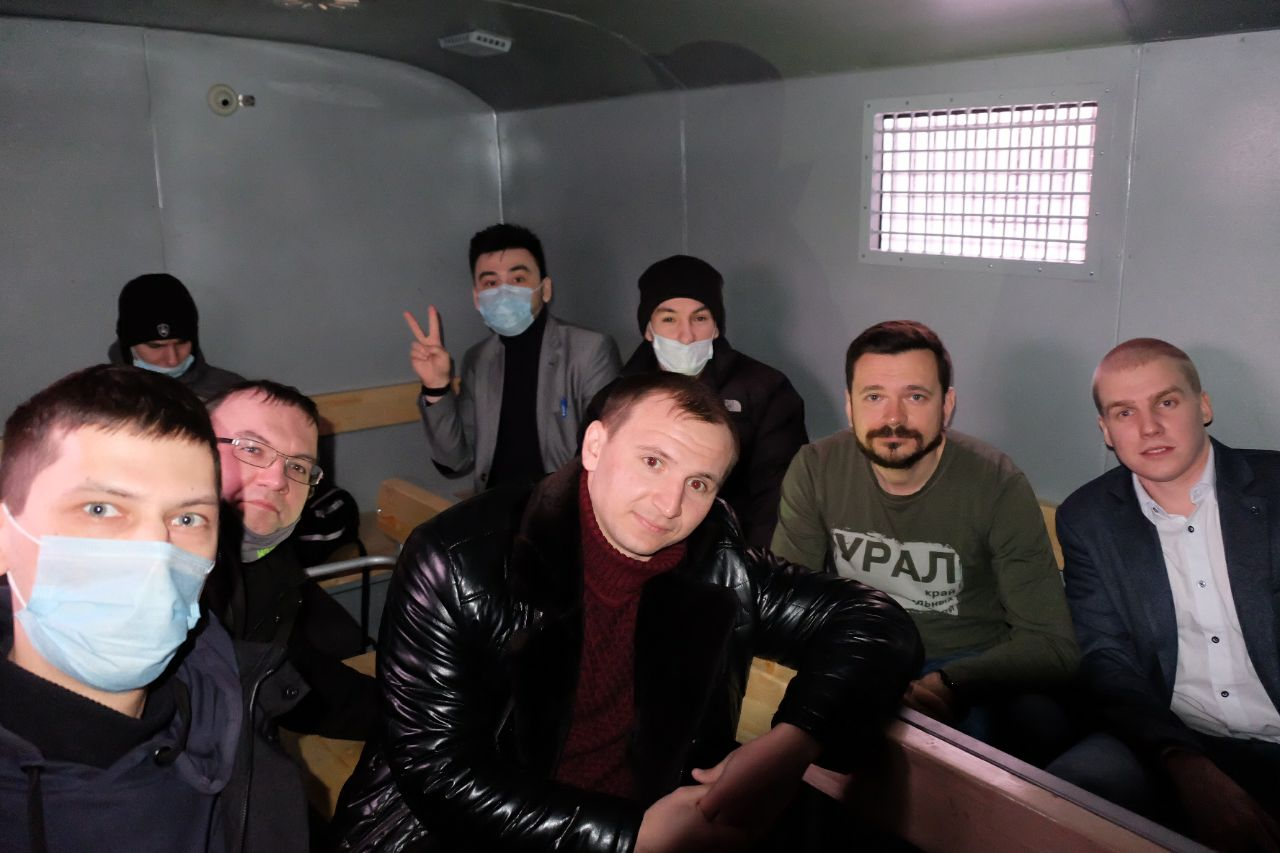
Yashin in a police van after being detained during the 2021 Russian protests

On 10 September 2017 Yashin was elected a municipal deputy of the Krasnoselsky district of Moscow. The Solidarnost team won 7 out of 10 seats in this district (the United Russia won the other 3). On 25 September 2017 he took the office. On 7 October 2017 Ilya Yashin was elected a chairman of the council of deputies of Krasnoselsky municipal district of Moscow.

One of the first initiatives of Yashin at the post was the bill on the cancellation of a lump sum rewards provided for by the city legislation for retirement municipal employees, which Yashin introduced to the Moscow City Duma in October 2017. The reason was the corresponding request of his predecessor from the United Russia party, who applied for the payment of 5 salaries, which amounted to 500,000 rubles (US$5,600) . She argued that the requested amount of half as much as it was due to her years, and the funds of the municipal budget provided for such payments cannot be used for other purposes, Yashin considered this practice a kind of "golden parachutes". In December 2017, Yashin abandoned the official car with a driver, which was supplied to him as the head of the municipal district, and since April 2018 this car began to be used as a social taxi for the small residents of the district.

On 11 April 2018 Yashin announced his intention to run in the election for Moscow mayor's office and beat the incumbent Sergey Sobyanin.

On 25 June 2021, he was barred from running in the upcoming legislative election after being considered an "extremist". He reported that he considered it was due to his support for Alexei Navalny.

=== Arrest and imprisonment ===
On 4 March 2022, Russian President Vladimir Putin signed into law a bill introducing prison sentences of up to 15 years for those who publish "knowingly false information" about the Russian armed forces and their operations.

On 27 June 2022, Ilya Yashin was detained in Moscow by local police. On 28 June, Yashin was sentenced to 15 days in detention for disobeying a police officer. Yashin called the case politically motivated and intended to suppress his political stance towards the war in Ukraine.

On 12 July, Yashin was accused by the Investigative Committee of Russia of discrediting the Russian Armed Forces and his home was searched. On 13 July, a court ordered his pretrial detention; Yashin was tried over a YouTube video released in April 2022 in which he discussed the discovery of murdered Ukrainian civilians in the suburban town of Bucha, near Kyiv. State prosecutor requested nine years in prison for Yashin. Amnesty International and other organisations called on the government to release him immediately, regarding his case as part of repressions on war critics.

On 9 December, a Moscow court sentenced Yashin to eight years and six months imprisonment for his statements about the circumstances of the killings in Bucha on charges of "spreading false information" about the armed forces. His punishment was the harshest given under the new laws which criminalize spreading "false" information about the armed forces. In his closing remarks to the court ahead of the verdict, Yashin said: "As if they will sew my mouth shut and I would be forbidden to speak forever. Everyone understands that this is the point. I am isolated from society because they want me to be silent. I promise as long as I'm alive I'll never will be. My mission is to tell the truth. I will not give up the truth even behind bars. After all, quoting the classic: 'Lie is the religion of slaves.'"

Yashin said about Russian President Vladimir Putin that "Strong leaders are calm and self-confident, and only weaklings seek to shut everyone up, burn out any dissent." Before his sentencing, he urged Putin to "immediately stop this madness, recognise that the policy on Ukraine was wrong, pull back troops from its territory and switch to a diplomatic settlement of the conflict". He further said addressing Putin: "You have brought terrible misfortune to the Ukrainian people, who will probably never forgive us."

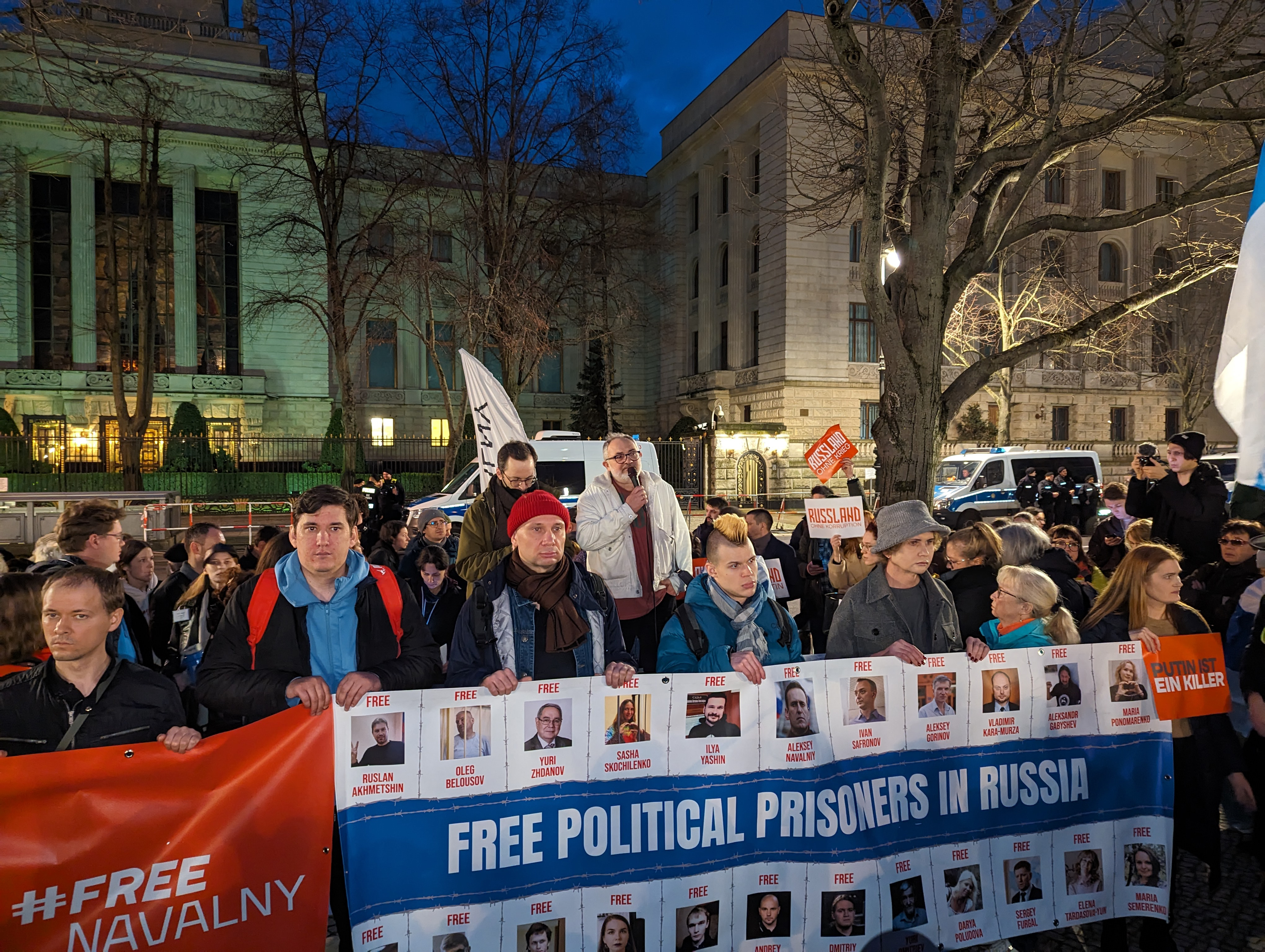
Protest outside the Russian Embassy in Berlin demanding the release of Russia's political prisoners, including Yashin, February 2024

In his closing speech, he said that "it is better to spend 10 years behind bars as an honest man than silently burning with shame for the blood that your government sheds."

On 19 April 2023, Yashin lost his appeal to his 8 1/2 years sentence at the Moscow City Court. In his speech before the court, Yashin called Putin a wanted war criminal and said that Putin's war censorship laws violate the 1993 Russian Constitution, which expressly prohibits censorship.

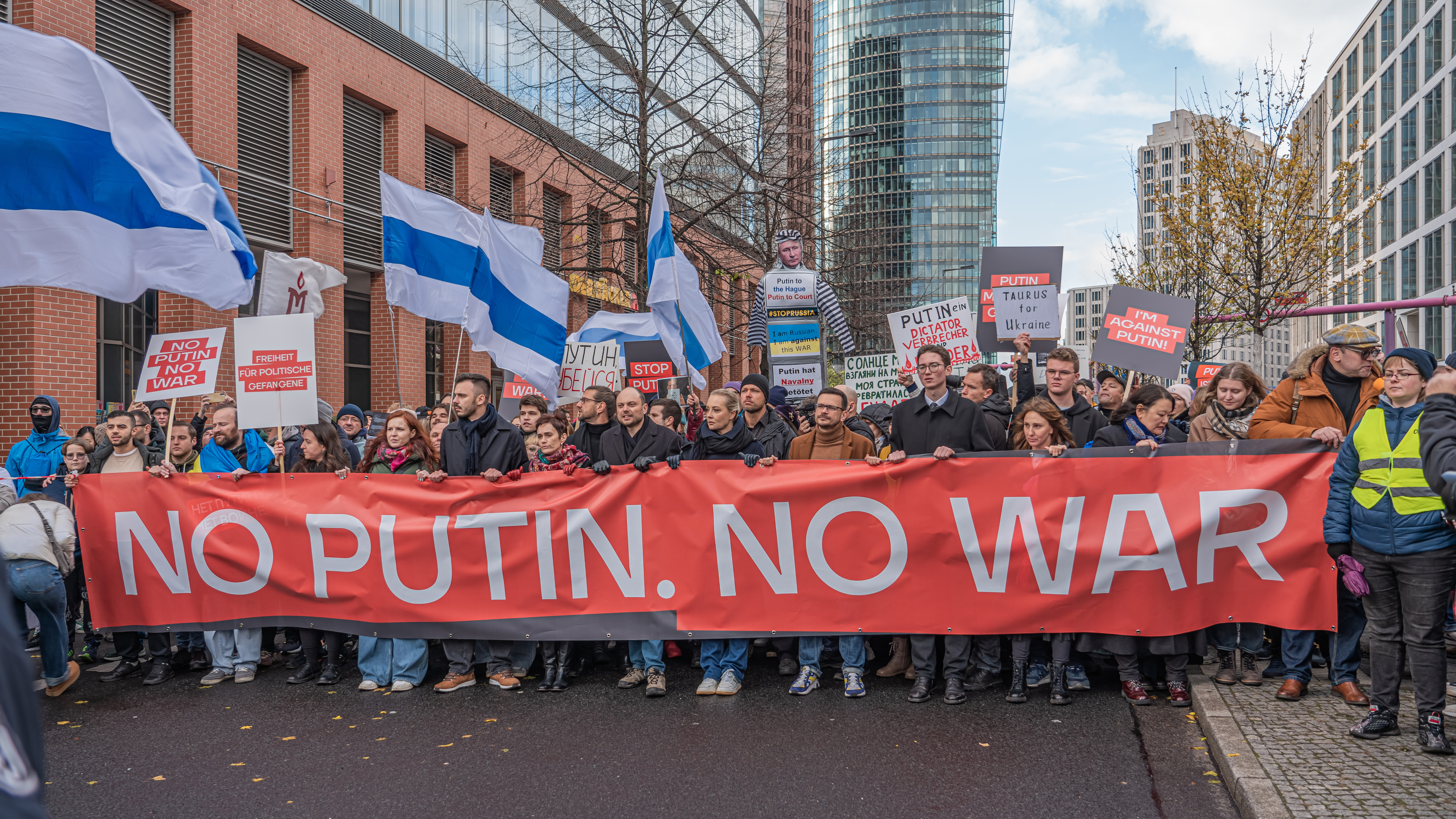
Yashin, Yulia Navalnaya and Vladimir Kara-Murza at an anti-war protest in Berlin, 17 November 2024

=== In emigration ===
On 1 August 2024 Yashin was, against his will, included in the 2024 Ankara prisoner exchange and deported to the West in exchange for a number of convicted Russian operatives and other criminals from western prisons. However, Yashin would condemn the fact that one of the prisoners that would be exchanged for his freedom was Vadim Krasikov, who had originally been sentenced to life in prison for the murder of Chechen dissident Zelimkhan Khangoshvili in Germany in 2019.

After his release in August 2024, Yashin told people at a rally in Berlin that he would try to reach as many people in Russia as possible through his YouTube channel, which has nearly 1.7 million followers, because: "We need to talk to them, and we need to pull these people out of the shackles of Putin's propaganda. We need to explain that this monstrous war against Ukraine ... is a war against Russia too, because this war is crippling ... entire generations. It is taking away the future of our country."

In December 2024, Russia placed Yashin on a wanted list for his refusal to identify himself as a "foreign agent." In January 2025, Yashin announced that Russian authorities had interrogated his parents in Russia and searched their home. He called the authorities' pressure on the families of Russian dissidents "disgusting."

On 8 September 2025, the Ministry of Internal Affairs of Russia declared Yashin a stateless person.

=== Foundation of political party ===
In 2026, Yashin began the creation of a political party in exile. The party's founding congress is planned to take place in Summer 2026 in Berlin; while the party's name was supposed to remain a secret up until then, one of the organizers of the party, Maxim Reznik, accidentally revealed the party name as "Peaceful Russia" beforehand. Reznik later denied that this would be the name to be used. Russian businessmen in exile helped to fund the first congress.

The party's main purpose is the unification of the Russian opposition in exile. The party's main goals are: "To ensure peaceful, free, and democratic development based on civil accord and good-neighborly relations with other countries." The party will mainly focus on supporting anti-war Russians abroad. Yashin described the party as the "First flight party," in reference to the first wave of return to post-dictatorship Russia. Yashin also compared the situation around politicized Russian emigration to the XIX century situation in Russian Empire; opposition political circles were banned and persecuted by the Okhranka until a wave of liberalization. He also compared the situation to the fall of Antonio Salazar in Portugal, after which the in-exile Partido Socialista party won the first free post-Salazar election.

The party also plans to integrate into the European Union's political system. According to Yashin, it may also join a European political group, like the Alliance of Liberals and Democrats for Europe.

== Electoral history ==
2017 Moscow municipal elections (Krasnoselsky district)
| Candidate | Votes | % | |
|---|---|---|---|
| Ilya Yashin | 919 | 37.24% | Elected ✓ |
| Total | 2470 | 22.28% | |

== See also ==
- Putin. War
- Russian 2022 war censorship laws
- Transnational repression by Russia

== Literature ==
- Mickiewicz E. No Illusions: The Voices of Russia's Future Leaders. — Oxford University Press, 2014. — P. 198. — 288 p. — ISBN 9780199977857. — ISBN 0199977852.
- Putin's Opponents: Enemies of the People / The Associated Press. — Mango Media, 2015. — 198 p. — ISBN 9781633531826. — ISBN 1633531821.
- Bennetts M. I'm Going to Ruin Their Lives: Inside Putin's War on Russia's Opposition. — Oneworld Publications, 2016. — P. 99–101, 105, 149. — 320 p. — ISBN 9781780744322. — ISBN 1780744323.
- Lyytikainen L. Performing Political Opposition in Russia: The Case of the Youth Group Oborona. — Routledge, 2016. — 202 p. — (The Mobilization Series on Social Movements, Protest, and Culture). — ISBN 9781317082293. — ISBN 131708229X.
