= M8 highway (Russia) =

Federal highway in Russia

Coordinates: 59°39′07″N 40°34′15″E

Federal Highway M8
- Федеральная автомобильная дорога М8
- Kholmogory
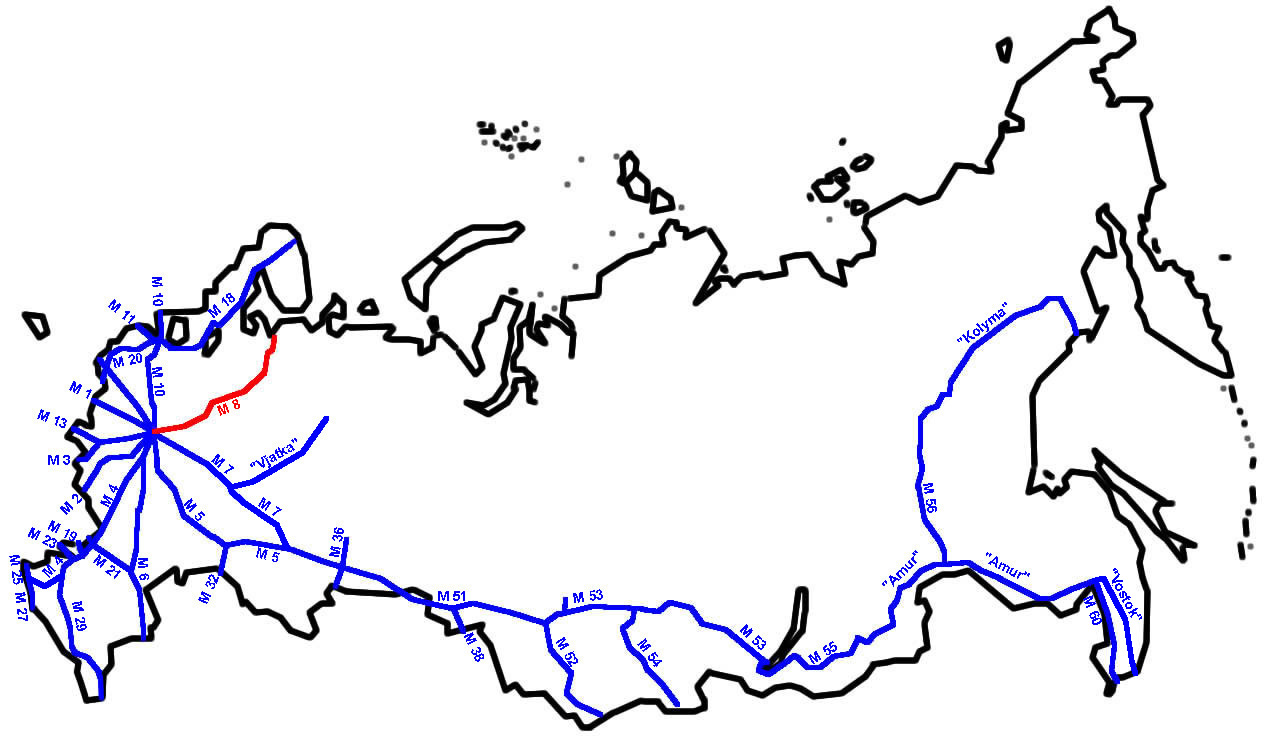

Route information
- Part of E115
- Length: 1,271 km (790 mi)

Major junctions
- North end: Severodvinsk
- South end: MKAD in Moscow

Location
- Country: Russia

Highway system
- Russian Federal Highways
← M 7	→ M 9

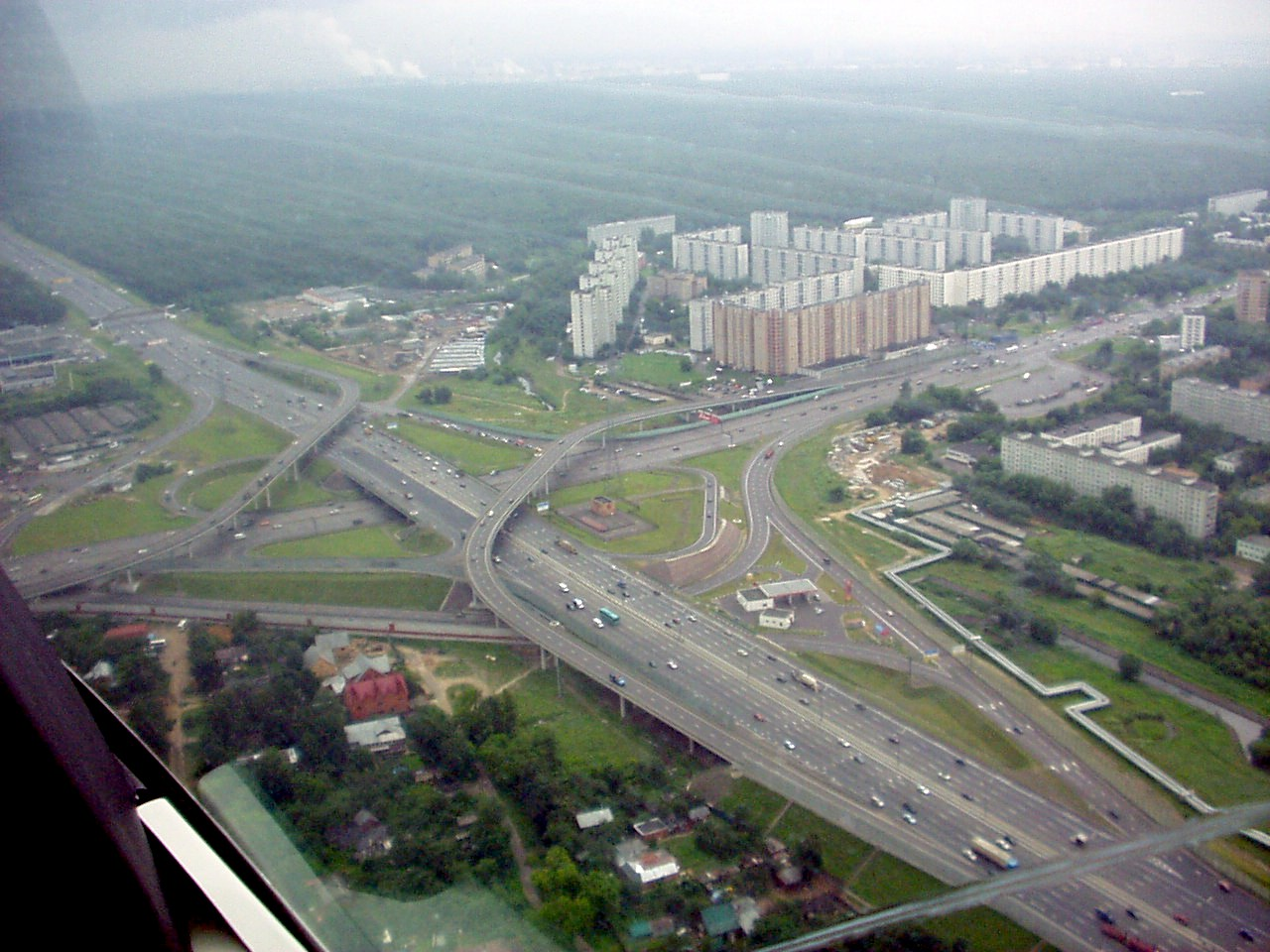
The juncture of the Moscow Ring Road and M8.

The Russian route M8 "Kholmogory" (Russian: М-8 «Холмогоры») or Yaroslavl highway (Russian: Ярославское шоссе), is a major trunk road that links Moscow to the Russian North in general and the sea harbour of Arkhangelsk in particular. The road runs north of Moscow across a distance of 1271 kilometres through Mytishchi, Pushkino, Sergiyev Posad, Pereslavl-Zalessky, Rostov Veliky, Yaroslavl, Danilov, Gryazovets, Vologda, Kadnikov, Velsk, Kholmogory, and Arkhangelsk, ending up in the city of Severodvinsk. It passes Moscow, Vladimir, Yaroslavl, Vologda, and Arkhangelsk Oblasts.

In Moscow, the highway is known as Yaroslavskoe Shosse.

The stretch of the highway between Moscow and Yaroslavl is part of the Golden Ring of Russia and is also part of European route E115.

== History ==
The predecessor of the highway was the Yam service state road which was established in the end of 14th century and connected Moscow to Kholmogory. Arkhangelsk was founded in 1548 and until early the 18th century served as the main gateway for foreign trade in Russia. In 1703, Saint Petersburg was founded, but the postal service still proceeded via Arkhangelsk, since the Saint Petersburg route was uncertain doe to the war between Russia and Sweden. In 1693, the regular state postal service along the route was established by Peter the Great.

In the 18th century, Arkhangelsk lost its significance, and the road was badly maintained. Since 1834, when the postal service in Arkhangelsk Governorate was created, the road maintenance had to be funded from local sources. The road was split into sections funded locally. By the middle of the 19th century, the road comprised 143 bridges and four river crossings. Fourteen postal stations operated with 140 horses. After the October Revolution of 1917 the road was subordinated to the Department of Northern Okrug of Local Transportation and pretty much neglected due to the lack of expertise.

The construction of the modern paved highway connecting Moscow and Arkhangelsk was planned in the 1950s and actually started in 1961. In 1967, the paved road between Kholmogory and Arkhangelsk was opened. Much of the construction work was completed by the end of the 1970s, however, most of the road (all stretches north of Yaroslavl) still only supports two- or three-lane traffic.

== Route ==
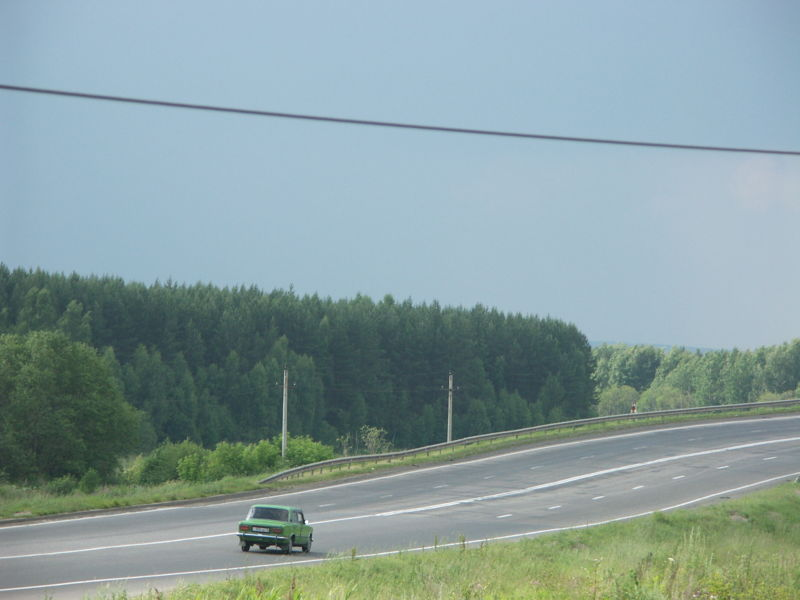
M8 close to Rostov, Yaroslavl Oblast.

The highway starts in Moscow as Bolshaya Lubyanka Street, Sretenka Street, Mira Avenue, and Yaroslavsky Highway. It crosses the Moscow Ring Road and proceeds to the Moscow Region as a dual carriageway. It runs through the urban area of Mytishchi, bypasses the center of Pushkino and bypasses Sergiyev Posad. As of 2011, the dual carriageway ends at the border of Moscow Oblast, northeast of the city of Sergiyev Posad. The highway crosses a short stretch of Vladimir Oblast and enters Yaroslavl Oblast.

It further runs through the center of Pereslavl-Zalessky (there is a ring road) and through the centers of Rostov and Yaroslavl. As of 2011, a stretch which starts north of Rostov and ends south of Yaroslavl was built as a dual carriageway. In Yaroslavl, the highway crosses the Volga River over a bridge. It further bypasses the center of Danilov and enters Vologda Oblast.

The highway bypasses the center of Gryazovets and runs into the center of Vologda. The ring road was built in the 2000s which bypasses the center of Vologda from the north, crossing the Vologda River. M8 runs further in the northern direction, bypassing the center of Sokol (it crosses the Sukhona River in the village of Vasyutino southwest of Sokol) and running through the center of Kadnikov. It further passes through the selo and the district center of Syamzha and bypasses Verkhovazhye before entering Arkhangelsk Oblast.

M8 runs through the center of Velsk and further north along the left bank of the Vaga River, bypassing the town of Shenkursk (located on the right bank of the Vaga), and north of Bereznik - along the left bank of the Northern Dvina River. It further bypasses the town of Novodvinsk and connects to Arkhangelsk, located on the right bank of the Northern Dvina, by a bridge. The highway route continues further 45 kilometres (28 mi) along the left bank of the Northern Dvina to Severodvinsk where it terminates.

== Junctions ==
In Moscow and Moscow Oblast, where the highway is built as a dual carriageway, it has a limited number of two-level intersections. These intersections are not numbered in Russia.

In Moscow, the two-level intersections are

- Rizhskaya Interchange, where Mira Avenue crosses the Third Ring Road;
- The interchange close to All-Russia Exhibition Centre, connecting Mira Avenue with a number of streets including Zvyozdny Boulevard and Borisa Galushkina Street;
- The interchange with Dokukina Street and Rostokinskaya Street;
- Severyaninsky Interchange, which joins Mira Avenue and Yaroslavskoye Highway and connects them with Yeniseyskaya Street and a number of other streets;
- The interchange with Roterta Street and Kholmogorskaya Street;
- The interchange with the Moscow Ring Road (94 kilometer mark of the Ring Road).
