= Meshchansky =

Meshchansky (masculine), Meshchanskaya (feminine), or Meshchanskoye (neuter) may refer to:

- Meshchansky District, a district in Central Administrative Okrug of Moscow, Russia
- Meshchansky (rural locality), a rural locality (a settlement) in Saratov Oblast, Russia
