= Bolshaya Lubyanka Street =

Street in Moscow, Russia

Bolshaya Lubyanka
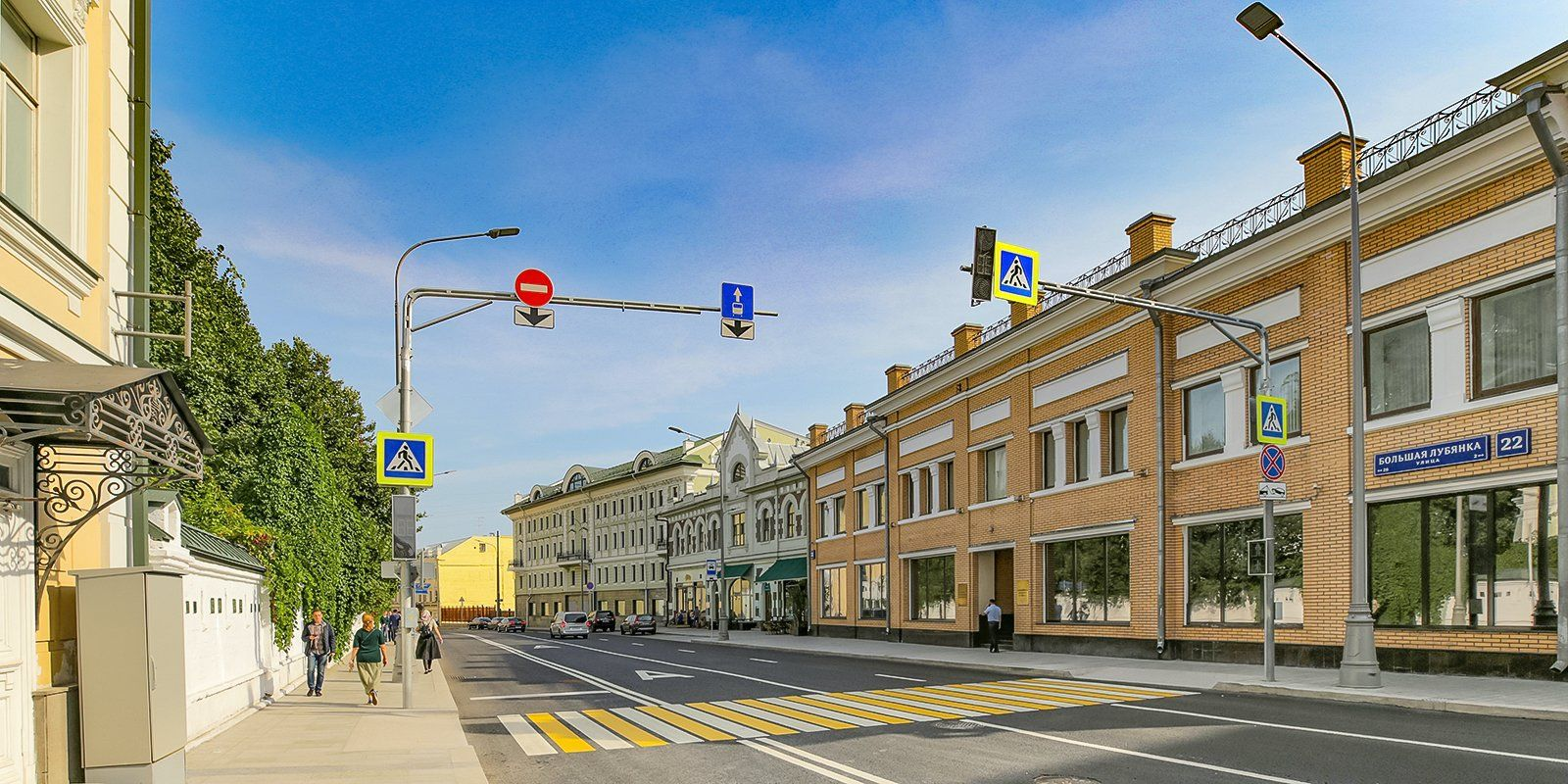
- Native name: Большая Лубянка (Russian)
- Location: Moscow; Central Administrative Okrug; Krasnoselsky District; Meshchansky District
- Nearest metro station: Lubyanka; Turgenevskaya; Trubnaya
- Coordinates: 55°45′49″N 37°37′46″E

Bolshaya Lubyanka Street (known as Dzerzhinskogo Street from 1926–1990) is a radial street in Moscow's Central Administrative Okrug. The street runs north-east from Lubyanka Square to Sretenka Gates Square on the Boulevard Ring. The path of Bolshaya Lubyanka is continued by Sretenka Street (to Garden Ring), Mira Avenue and Yaroslavskoye Shosse and is the starting stretch of the route of M8 highway ("Kholmogory"), connecting Moscow to Sergiyev Posad, Yaroslavl, Vologda, and Arkhangelsk.

== Overview ==
The street serves as the boundary between Meshchansky District (west from Bolshaya Lubyanka) and Krasnoselsky District (east).

The first mention of the name "Lubyanka" dates from 1480; it was given to this street in honour of the "Lubyanets", one of the medieval Veliky Novgorod hoods when the Tsar Ivan III ordered the captured citizens of the Novgorod Republic to establish settlements in the place of the contemporary Lubyanka Square. There is also another version of the origin of the name: there were the places were the locals were taking the splint (Лубок/Lubok) from the trees.

In the 16th and 17th centuries traders and craftsmen were living there, since the 18th century the local nobility began building residences there. During the Fire of 1812 the street did not suffer.

Between 1926 and 1991 the street was known as Dzerzhinskogo Street, after Felix Dzerzhinsky.

The street is also where the KGB's headquarters were, at no. 2.

== See also ==
- Sretensky Monastery
