= Peaceful Russia =

Peaceful Russia Мирная Россия
- Founders: Ilya Yashin
- Founded: 12 June 2026
- Headquarters: Berlin
- Ideology: Anti-Putinism; Liberalism; Christian democracy Antimilitarism
- Political position: Big tent (Non-system opposition)
- State Duma: 0 / 450

Party flag

Website
- www.mirparty.org

Peaceful Russia (Russian: Мирная Россия) is a Russian opposition, anti-war, "umbrella" political party that operates from exile and is not registered in Russia. The party was established on the initiative of—and is led by—politician Ilya Yashin. Its founding congress took place in Berlin on June 12–13, 2026 (coinciding with Russia Day), with approximately 100 delegates in attendance; Yashin was elected as its chairman. The name alludes to a phrase used by Alexei Navalny during the 2011 protests: "We are a peaceful force".

== Structure ==
The party’s charter allows for operations both inside and outside Russia, permits remote enrollment, enables clandestine membership under a pseudonym, and provides for party-wide votes of confidence in the leadership. Within the party, initiative groups are being formed around liberal, Christian-democratic, feminist, and LGBT-focused factions.

== History ==
Founding congress of the party

Ilya Yashin announced plans to establish a political party from abroad in a video message posted to his YouTube channel on March 19, 2026. The founders chose June 12–13—coinciding with Russia Day—for the inaugural congress, partly due to the holiday’s historical association with the rejection of the Soviet worldview.

The party’s inaugural congress took place in Berlin on June 12–13, 2026. The first day was held behind closed doors, while journalists were admitted on the second day. According to media reports, approximately 100 delegates participated, including former municipal deputies, activists, human rights defenders, and journalists. The congress approved the party’s manifesto and charter and elected its governing bodies. The sources of the party’s funding have not been disclosed; Yashin stated that he is receiving support from "representatives of the Russian non-extractive business sector in exile", whose names remain confidential for security reasons. A stylized image of a cat served as the logo for the congress. The party does not yet have an official logo; according to its charter, this will be determined by the Central Political Council.

On November 6, 2026, the Russian Ministry of Justice added the party to its registry of "foreign agents".

== Ideology ==
Yashin characterized the party as a "first-wave" party—a reference to the initial wave of returns to Russia following the collapse of a dictatorship.

Drawing historical parallels, Yashin compared the situation of political exiles to that of the 19th-century Russian Empire, where opposition circles were banned and persecuted by the Okhrana (secret police) until a period of liberalization—marked by the October Manifesto—after which parties that had previously existed in exile were legalized and integrated into the country’s political system. Another example is the fall of the Salazar regime in Portugal (the Carnation Revolution): the Socialist Party, which had been founded in exile, won the first free elections held after the change in power..

Among the stated practical objectives are political education, support for adherents within Russia, and integration into the European Union's political system—including potential membership in one of the European political groups, such as Renew Europe (which is similar to the Alliance of Liberals and Democrats for Europe).
