= Mira Avenue =

Thoroughfare in Moscow, Russia

Coordinates: 55.8133°N 37.6381°E

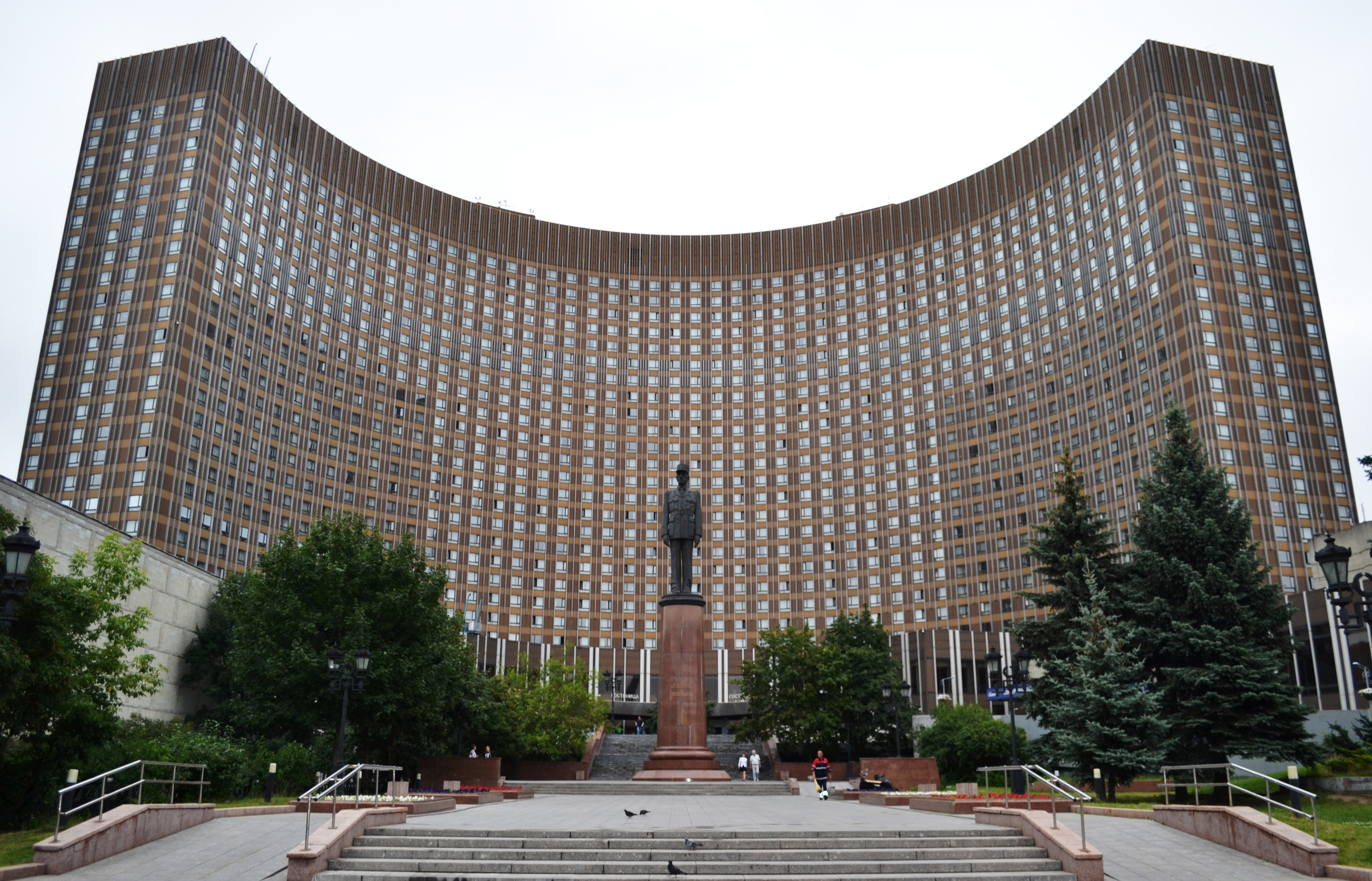
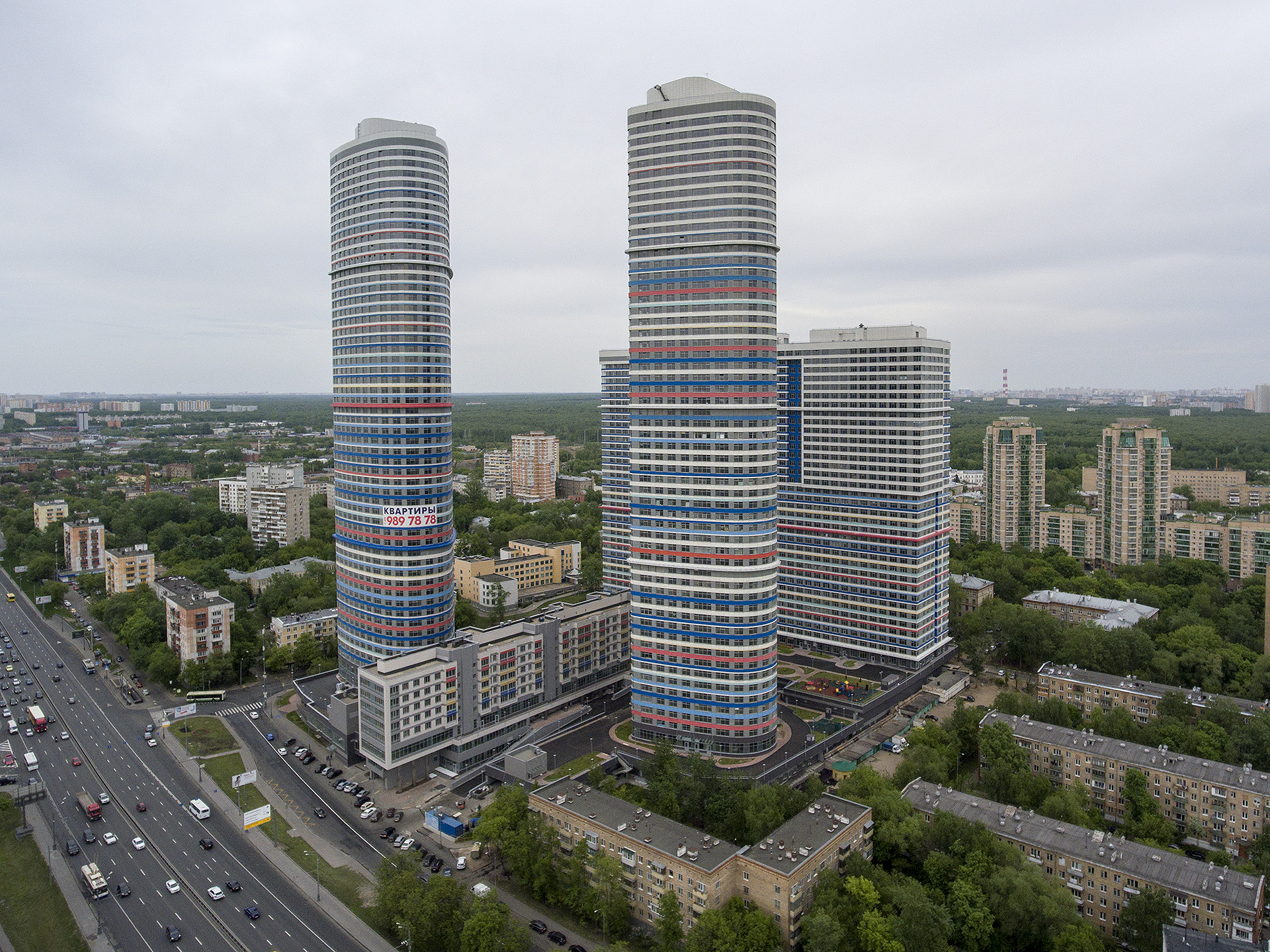
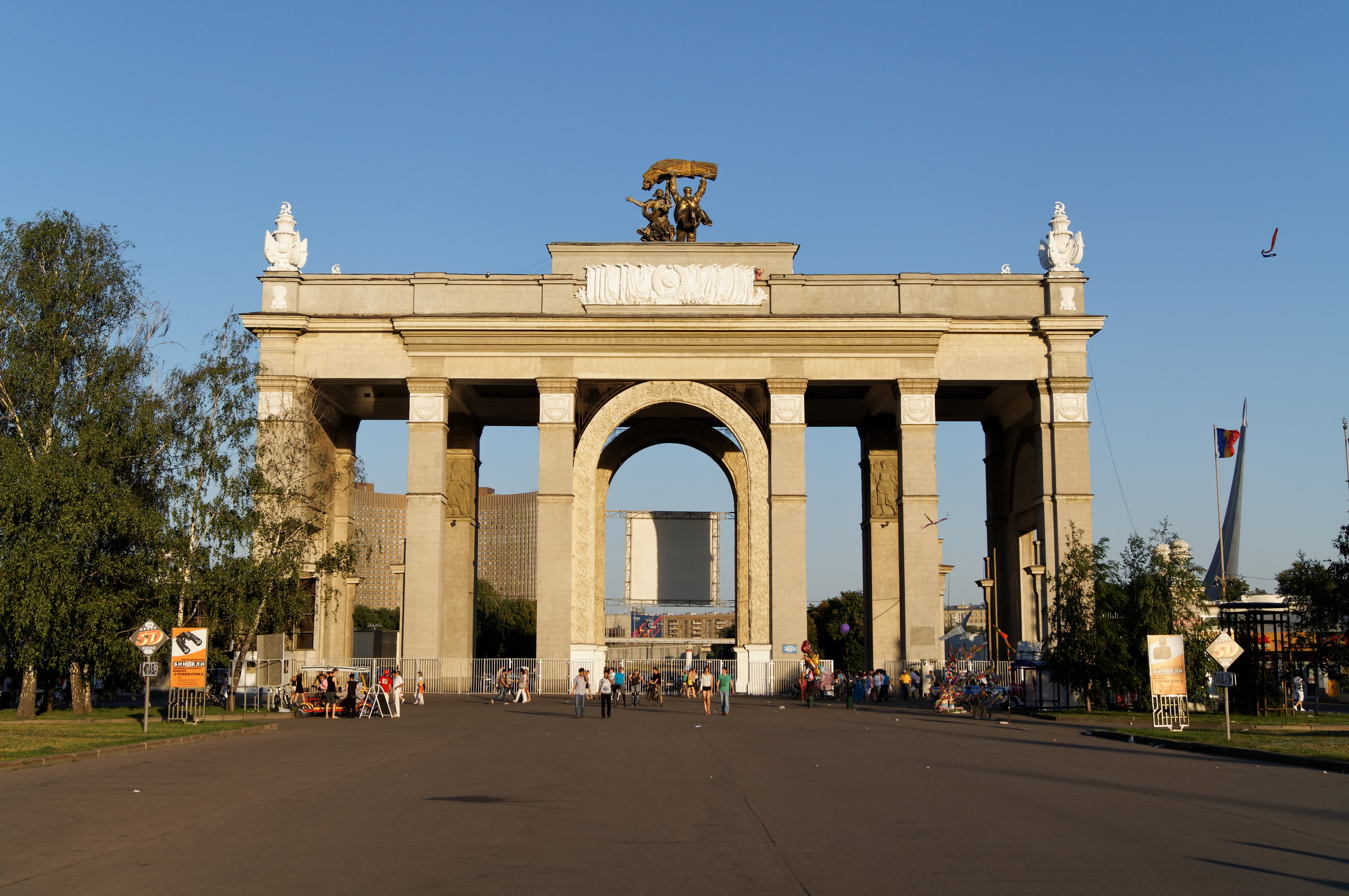
- Clockwise from top: Cosmos Hotel, The main entrance to VDNKh, Residential complex Tricolor
- Native name: Проспект Мира (Russian)
- Length: 8.9 km (5.5 mi)
- Location: Moscow; Central Administrative Okrug; North-Eastern Administrative Okrug
- Nearest metro station: Sukharevskaya; Prospekt Mira; Prospekt Mira; Rizhskaya; Alekseyevskaya; VDNKh

Prospect Mira (Russian: Проспект Мира, "Avenue of Peace") is a major arterial avenue in the north-east of Moscow. Until 1957, different sections of the avenue were named 1st Meschanskaya Street, Trinity Highway, Great Alekseevskaya Street, Great Rostokinskiy Street and Yaroslavl Highway. Today, it is one of the longest Moscow arteries, measuring 8.9 kilometres (5.5 miles) in length. It is located in the Sukharev area and is a continuation of Sretenka and Yenisei Streets, linking the Garden Ring near Sklifosovsky Hospital to the Moscow MKAD ring road extension of the M8 expressway.

== History ==
In the 12th century the street was the main road to Yaroslavl, along which were the villages of Alekseevskoe, Rostokino and others. At the end of the 17th century a Polish settlement grew up around the area. The name of the settlement came from the Polish word «mieszczanie» (townspeople), (hence the former name of "Meschanskaya Street"). In 1706, at the initiative of Peter The Great, the nearby Pharmaceutical Garden (later the University Botanical Garden) was founded. In the 1740s the street was completed between the Krestovsky Gate and the Kamer-Kollezhsky Val (now Rizhskaya Square).

In the second half of the 19th century apartment houses and mansions were built along 1st Meschanskaya Street. At the end of the 19th century, number 5 was built for the tea merchant Perlov (architect Roman Klein) and the number 43a (architect Fyodor Schechtel), in 1885 - No. 3 (architect V. Zagorski), in 1909 - No. 30, which belonged to I.K. Baev (architect V.I. Chagin), where Valery Bryusov lived in 1910.

In 1930 the reconstruction of 1st Meshchanskaya Street, Trinity Highway, Great Alekseevskaya Street, and Great Rostokinskiy Street began. In 1931, 1st Meschanskaya Street was paved by the American firm "Seabrook" but after two years the surface crumbled, unable to withstand the extremes of temperature. In 1934, the roadway was expanded through the elimination of the tram tracks, fences and front gardens next to houses. By September 1935 all tramways had been moved to the neighboring 2nd Meschanskaya street. Active reconstruction of the street began in 1936, when it was decided to build the All-Union Agricultural Exhibition on the street, near Ostankino (originally it was planned to be located in the Koptevo area). The development plan for the reconstruction was developed by the 4th architectural and planning workshop (APU) of Moscow City Council, led by the architect G. B. Barkhin. The basis of the plan composed in 1933-1934 for Dzerzhinsky Street, Sretenka, and 1st Meshchanskaya included the demolition of all the old buildings on the 1st Meshchanskaya. The plan provided for building between Sukharevskaya and Rizhskaya stations 19 or 20 seven floor buildings, most of which would be apartment buildings. This required demolition of 102 (out of 172) older buildings on the 1st Meshchanskaya Street.

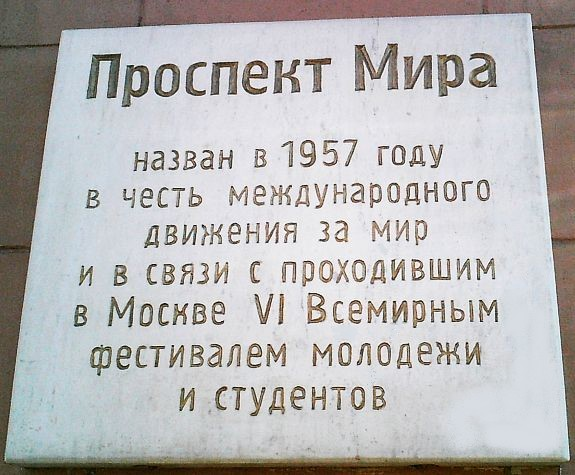
Plaque commemorating the renaming of the Street, at House No. 2

Because of the tight schedule (originally the All-Union Agricultural Exhibition was planned to open as early as 1937) and the lack of a fully developed architectural plan, the reconstruction of 1st Meshchanskaya street was put almost to chance. The street was divided into sections and assigned architects from APU 4 including D. D. Bulgakov, K. I. Dzhusom-Danilenko, E.P. Egorov, V.N. Kolpakova, M.S. Zhirovim, Maximov; the project also attracted architects from other workshops of the Moscow City Council - S. G. Andrievsky (APU 6), architects V. Minkov and P. Nesterov, from the studio of D. F. Friedman (APU 5), A.G. Turkenidze (APU 11), and others. In the spring of 1936 the design department the Moscow City Council delivered plans for the first buildings. Most of them were immediately accepted with minor adjustments, but a number of proposed plans were rejected. For instance, a residential project at the Botanical Garden designed by Konstantin Melnikov was rejected, the form of which would have combined light arches, similar to dried plants for a herbarium, and balconies in the form of bunches of flowers. In 1937 the Great and Small Krestovsky overpasses were built on the street.

In 1939 a sculptural group by Vera Mukhina was installed on the avenue, near the exhibition center, entitled "Worker and Collective Farm Girl".

In 1949, 800 poplars were planted on the street. 1st Meschanskaya in 1957 was renamed Prospekt Mira to commemorate the 6th World Festival of Youth and Students, held in Moscow that year. Also in 1957, the second Rostokinskiy bridge was erected.

In the 1960s, the Alley of Cosmonauts was created on Prospekt Mira. From the beginning of the 1960s, further large scale development was undertaken on the avenue in the Alekseevskogo and Rostokin districts.

In 1999 the Novorizhskiy overpass was built.

== Historical photos ==
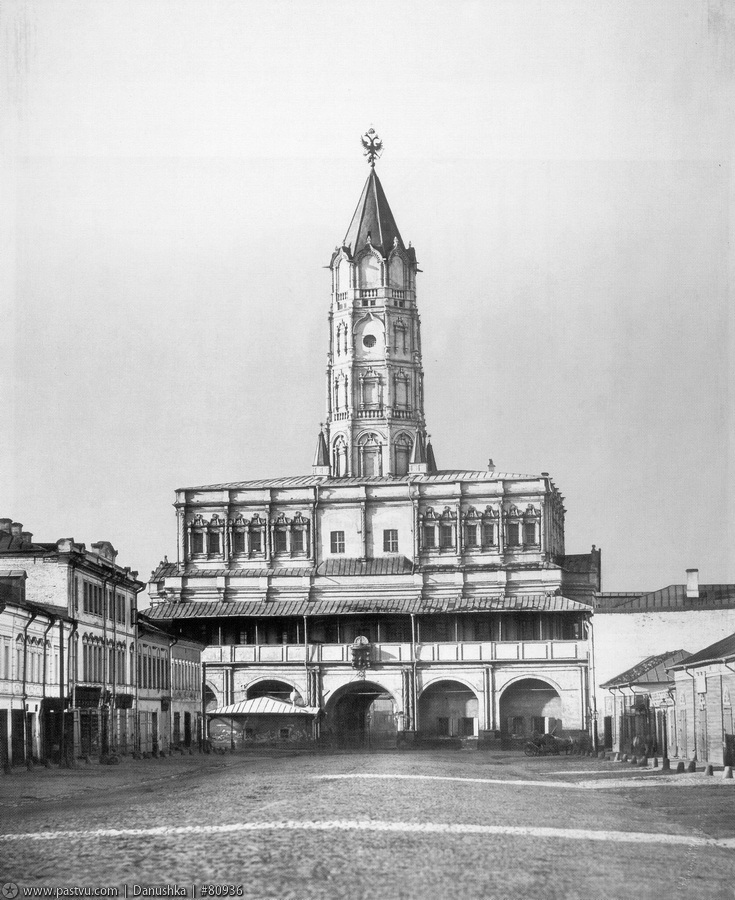
Sukharev Tower. View from the 1st Meshchanskaya, about 1880–1897. It demolished in 1934.

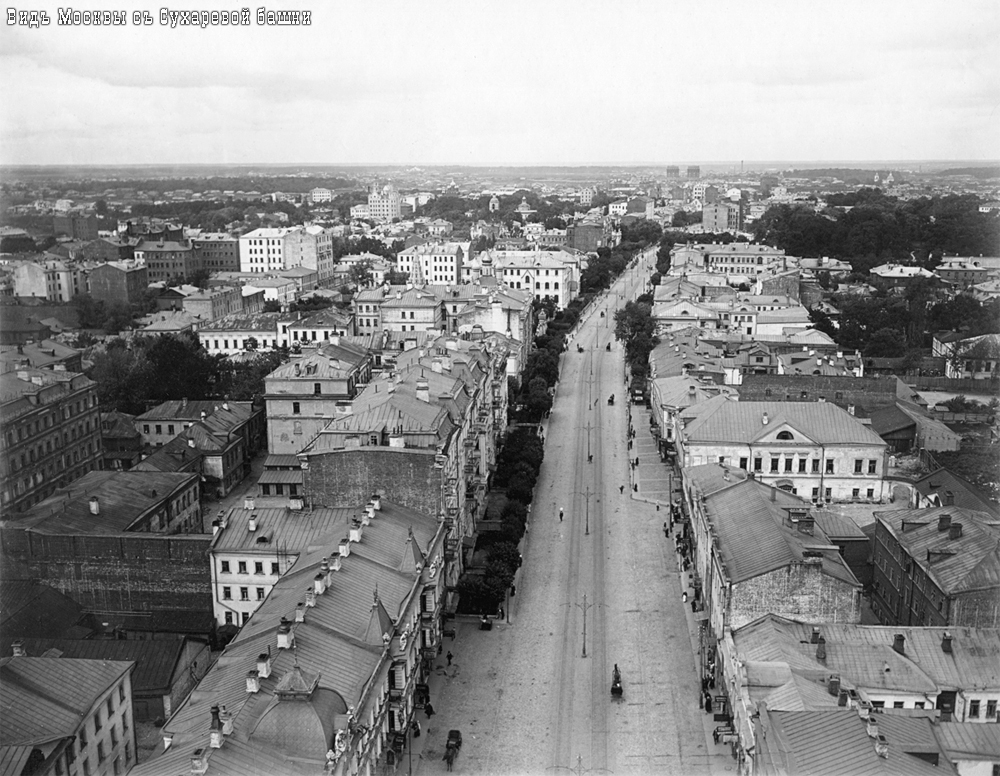
View of 1st Meshchanskaya Street, with Sukharev, towards Krestovsky Gate, 1914.

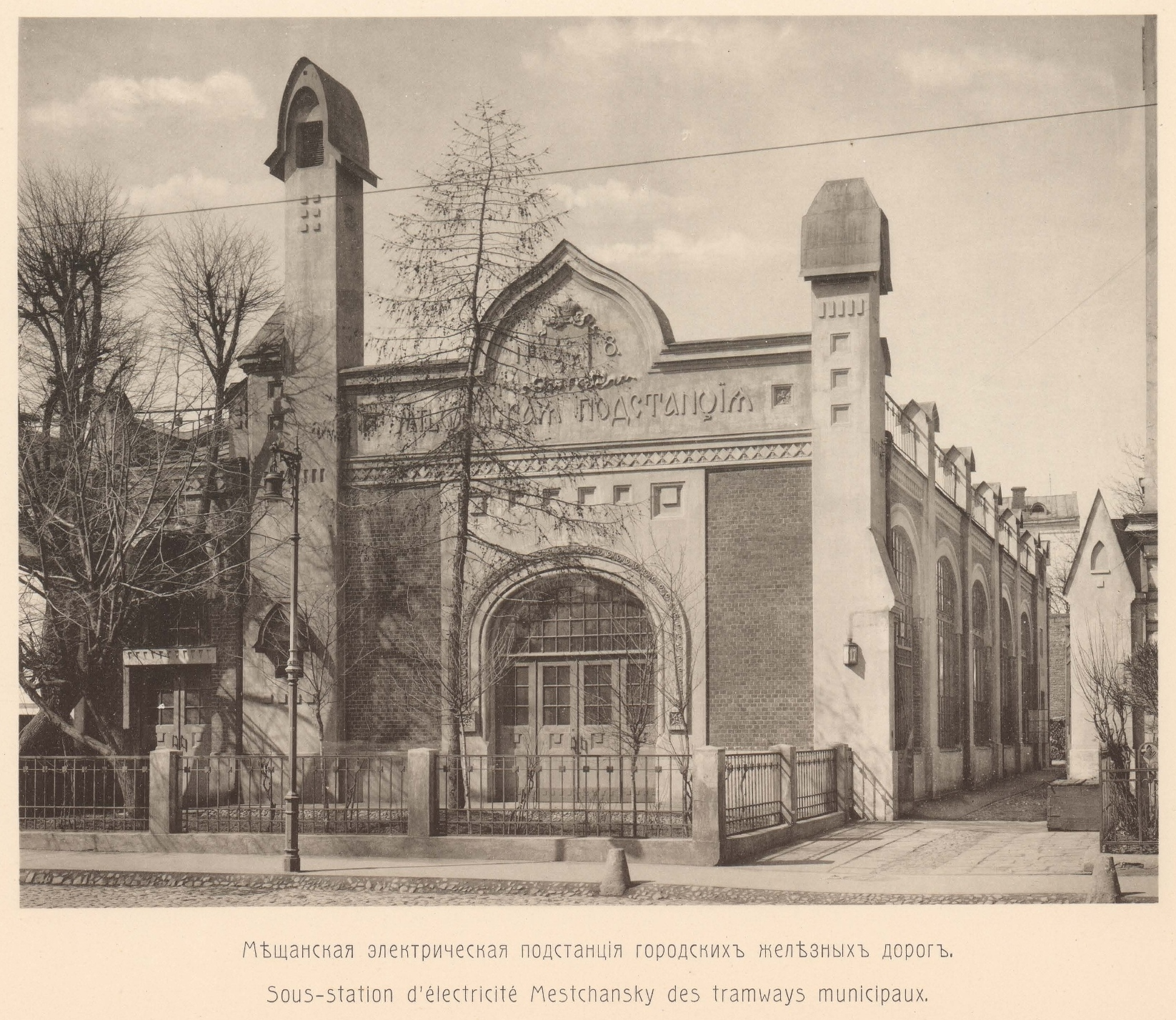
Meschanskaya electrical substation, urban railway, 1913.

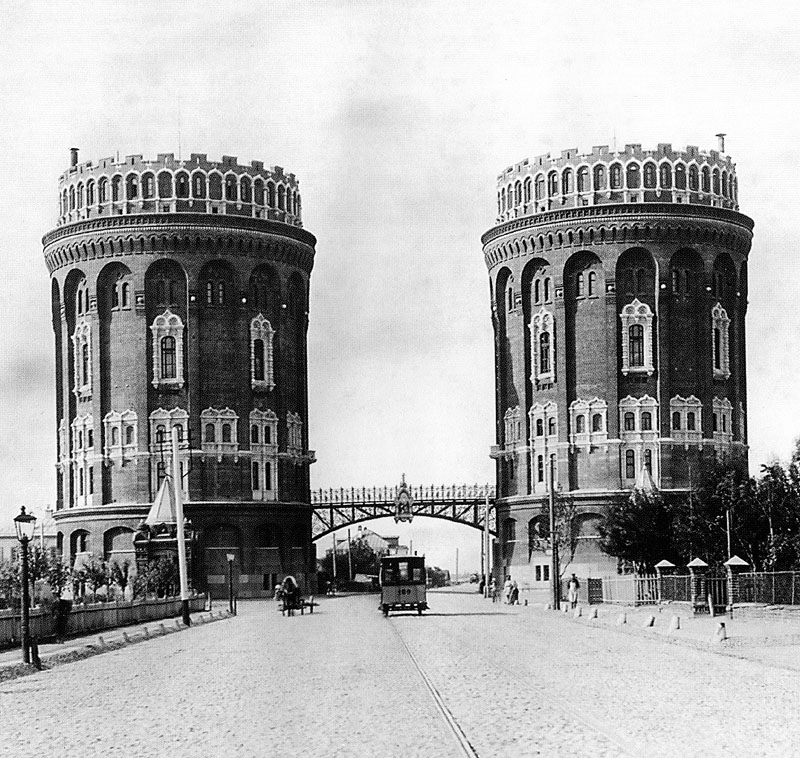
Krestovsky Water Towers, about 1900–1910. Demolished in 1940.

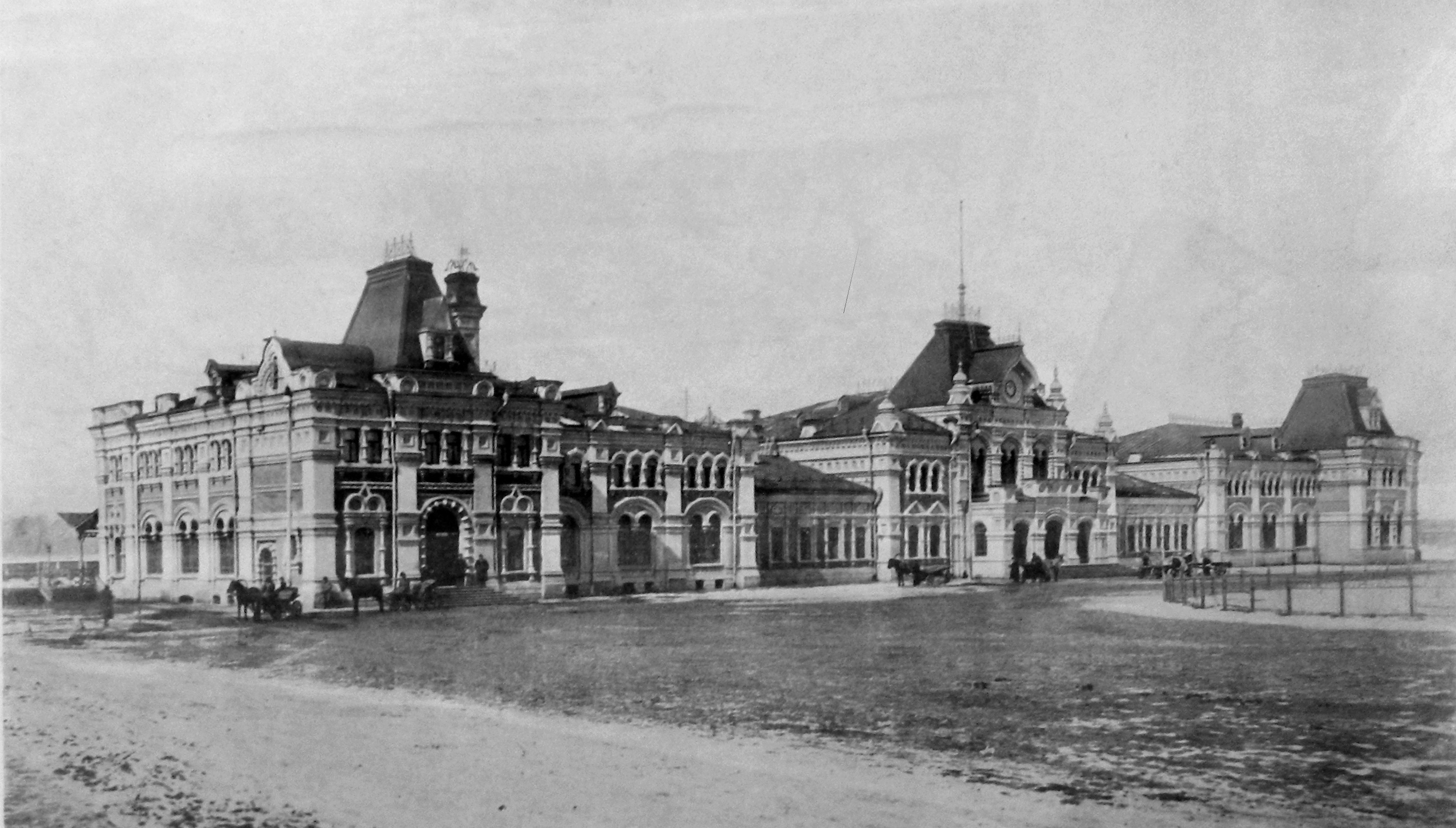
Vindavsky Station. View from 1st Meshchanskaya. 1901.

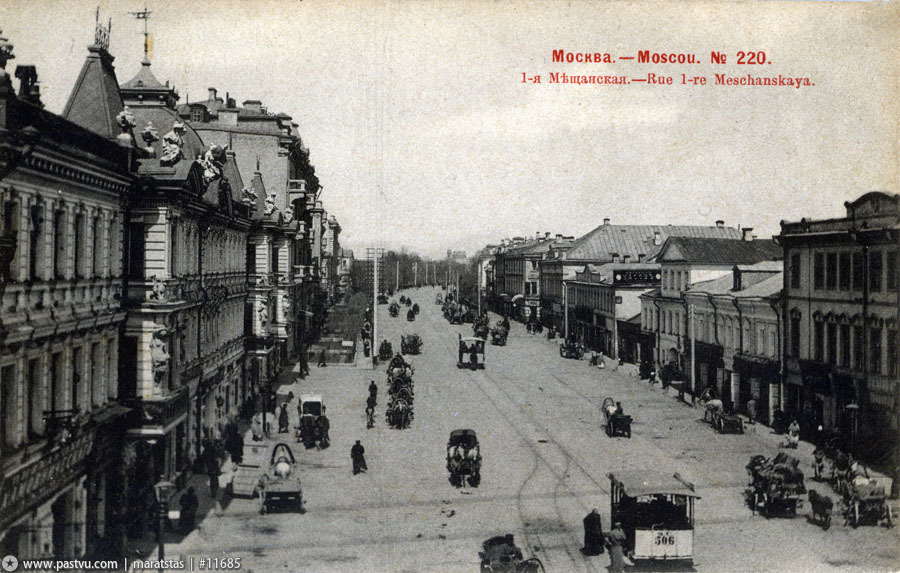
1st Meshchanskaya Street in 1902. View from the Sukharev Tower. Left: The apartment house of the merchant Kamzolkina. Right: Building 6, 8 (demolished), Building 10 (demolished until 1934, in its place built a new one). In the center of the street is horse-drawn railway.

== Notable buildings and structures ==
The avenue begins with decorative towers on both sides of the street, at the corners of houses number 1 and 2, built in 1938 by architect M. Rubin. Originally, the towers were decorated with the figure 1939, indicating the year of the planned opening of the Agricultural Exhibition; after the war they were rebuilt showing the ultimate opening date of 1954. The tower on the right (even) side of the street has survived to this day.

== Transport Links ==
Metro stations "Sukharevskaya", "Prospect Mira", "Rizhskaya", "Alekseevskaya", "VDNKh".

Bus routes 33, 56, 85, 93, 136, 172, 195, 244, 286, 714, 789, 834, 903; trolleybus routes number 9, 14, 37, 48, 76; tram (the area from the street Boris Galushkina to Severyaninskogo bridge) route number 17.

== Publications ==
Rogachev A.V. Prospects of Soviet Moscow. The history of the reconstruction of the main streets of the city, 1935–1990. - Tsentrpoligraf, 2015. - 448 p. - ISBN 978-5-227-05721-1.
