= Sretenka Street =

Street in Moscow, Russia

Coordinates: 55°46′09″N 37°37′54″E

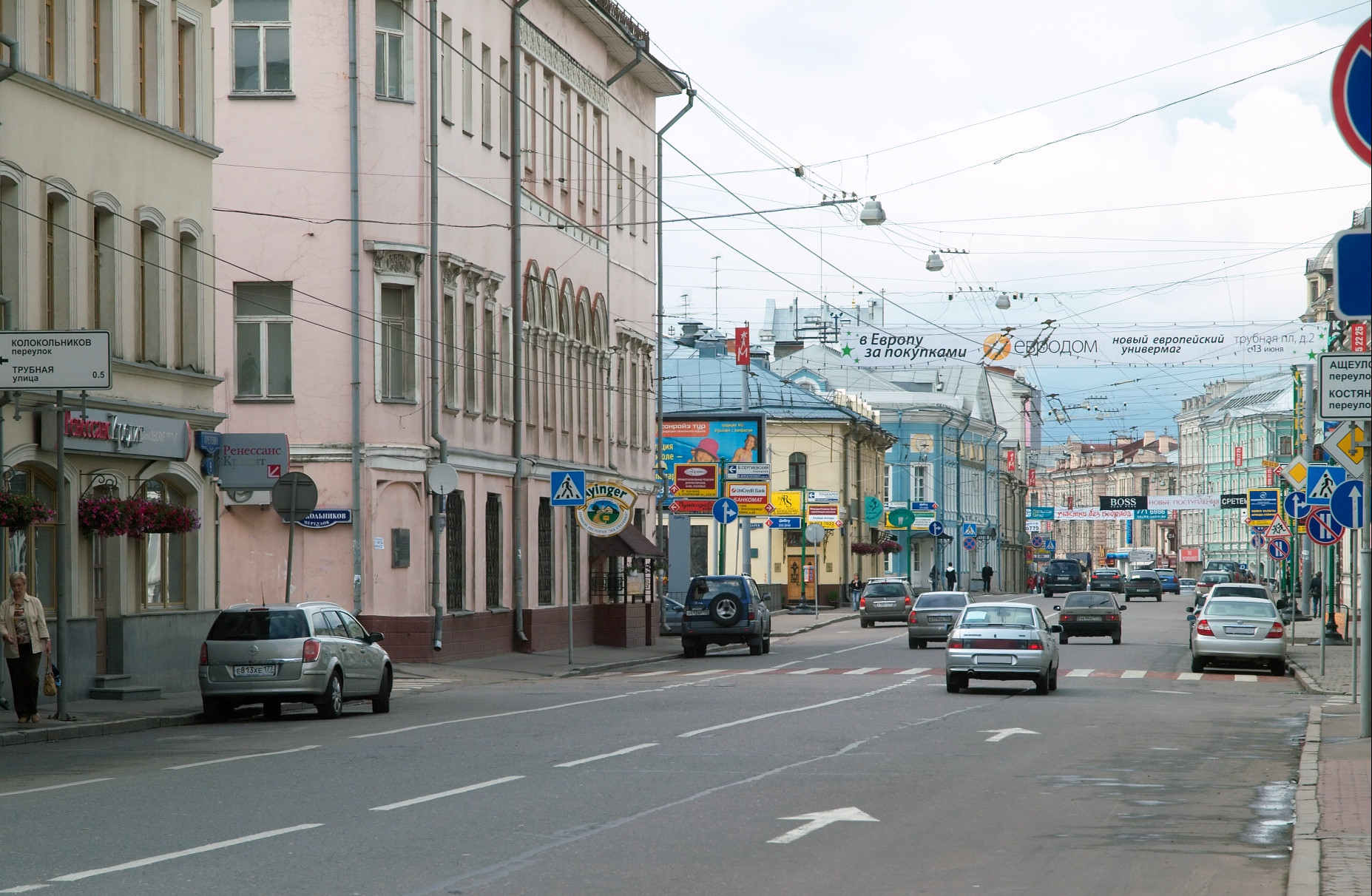
- Sretenka Street, June 2008
- Interactive map of Sretenka Street
- Native name: Улица Сретенка (Russian)
- Length: 0.68 km (0.42 mi)
- Location: Moscow, Russia; Central Administrative Okrug; Meshchansky District
- Postal code: 127051, 107045
- Nearest metro station: Turgenevskaya (300m); Sukharevskaya

Sretenka Street (Russian: улица Сретенка) is a street in Meshchansky district of the Central Administrative Okrug, Moscow. Sretenka Street goes from Sretenskie Vorota Square to Bolshaya Sukharevskaya and Malaya Sukharevskaya Squares.

The street was named in the 17th century by the Sretensky Monastery, which was located in this street (now part of the Sretenka called Bolshaya Lubyanka Street). The monastery also was named in honor of the deliverance of Moscow from the conquest of Timur's troops in 1395. While waiting for the invasion, the Grand Duke Vasily I of Moscow ordered to move from Vladimir to Moscow the Theotokos of Vladimir icon. On August 26 (September 8) of 1395 Muscovites came "sretat" Russian: сретать) (old Russian word for 'meet') the icon. In the meeting place of the icon in 1397 a monastery was founded called Sretensky. The old name of the street – Ustretenskaya ( Russian: Устретенская) (the beginning of the 16th century) and Stretinskaya Street.

== History ==
In 1395 the Great Vladimir road from Moscow to the Trinity Lavra of St. Sergius was renamed in Sretenka. The street was a part of an Orthodox pilgrimage to the Trinity Lavra (68 Verst). At the beginning of the 16th century the street was called Ustretenskaya. At that time behind the Sretensky gate a new settlement of traders and craftsmen began to emerge around the monastery. In the second half of 17th century the settlement was named Pankratevskaya "black" sloboda (Russian: Панкратьевская «черная» слобода).

A Moscow guide dated 1884 reports that Sretenka and the neighboring lanes: "bustling about always dirty, albeit not poor area of Moscow. Trade is mainly furniture and living essentials... There are not may hotels and lodging houses there, but plenty of all sorts of mid- and low-grade pubs and taverns... "
