= Krasnoselsky District, Moscow =

District of Central Administrative Okrug of Moscow, Russia

Coordinates: 55°46′43″N 37°39′23″E

Krasnoselsky District in Moscow

Flag of Krasnoselsky District

Coat of arms of Krasnoselsky District

Krasnoselsky District (Russian: Красносе́льский райо́н is a district of Central Administrative Okrug of the federal city of Moscow, Russia. The district recorded a population of 47,256 (2010 census); and 45,229 (2002 census).

Most of the district's territory is occupied by railroads, rail yards, and the three rail terminals around Komsomolskaya Square. It also contains a narrow sector of central Moscow, extending north-east from Lubyanka Square within the boundaries of Myasnitskaya Square and Bolshaya Lubyanka Street. However, the famous KGB-FSB Lubyanka building is technically part of Meshchansky District.

The boundary between Krasnoselsky and southbound Basmanny District passes through Red Gates Square and Novaya Basmannaya Street, thus Krasnoselsky District contains the northern edge of historical Basmannaya Sloboda, including the church of Saint Peter and Paul, built in 1705–1723 to a draft by Peter I.

The Black Angel of Glory on the coat of arms commemorates the loss of Red Gates in 1927, while the white Y denotes the three railroads that converge in Komsomoskaya Square.

== History ==
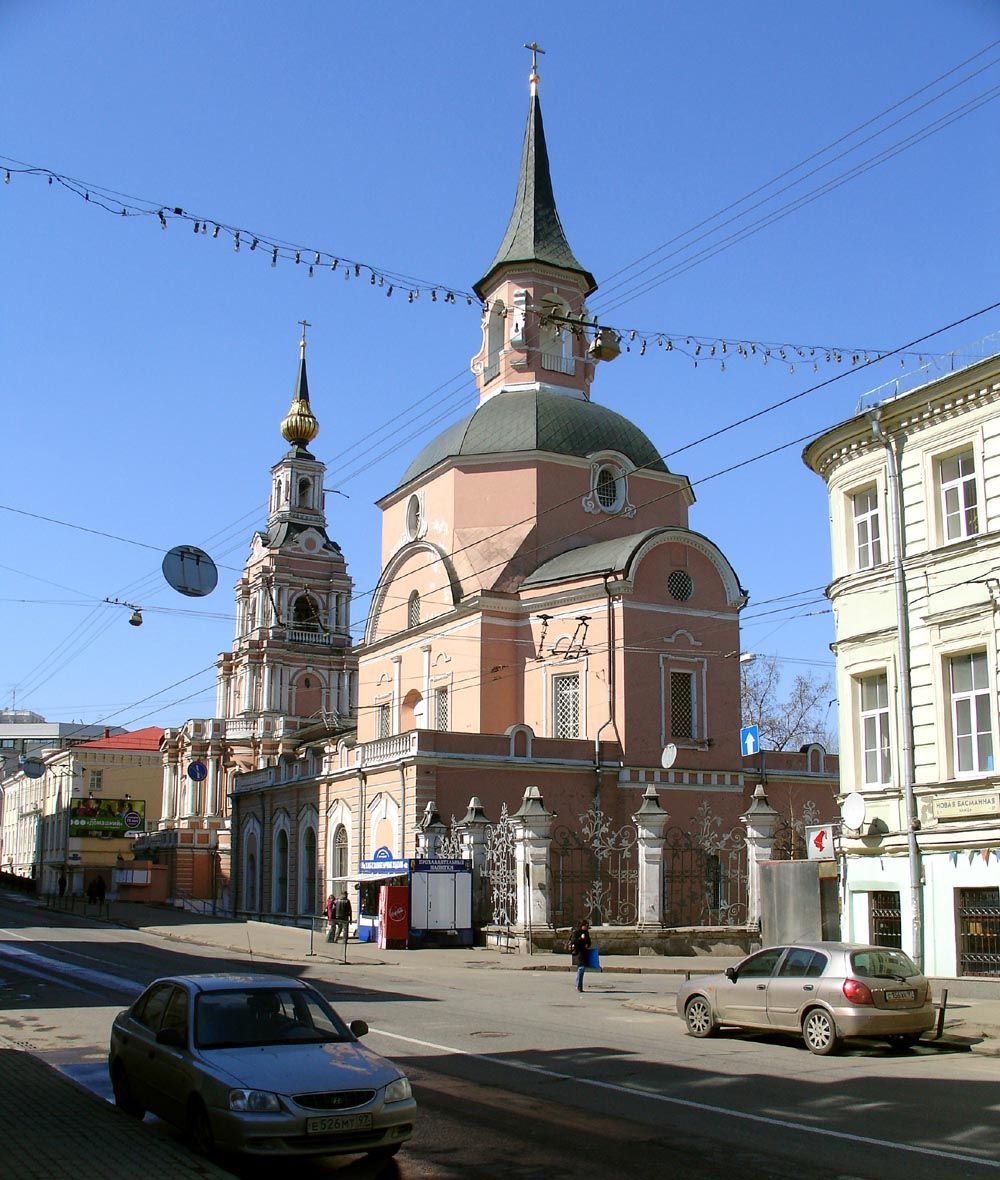
Church of Sts. Peter and Paul, built to a draft by Tsar Peter the Great

Krasnoye Selo (Красное Село, lit. beautiful village), that gave it name to the district and Krasnoselskaya Street, existed since Middle Ages east of present-day Kazansky Rail Terminal. It was separated from Moscow by a swamp around extinct Olkhovets Creek; construction of dams on the creek created a large pond that occupied present-day site of Yaroslavsky Rail Terminal and smaller ponds downstream.

In the 17th century, Russian military set up a fortified armoury west of the pond, on site of Leningradsky Rail Terminal, exceeding twenty hectares; it blew up during the 1812 fire of Moscow and was abandoned. Accounts of a royal palace placed north of the pond are, likely, not true, however, young tsar Peter I, who was raised in nearby Preobrazhenskoye, used to ride boats on the pond.

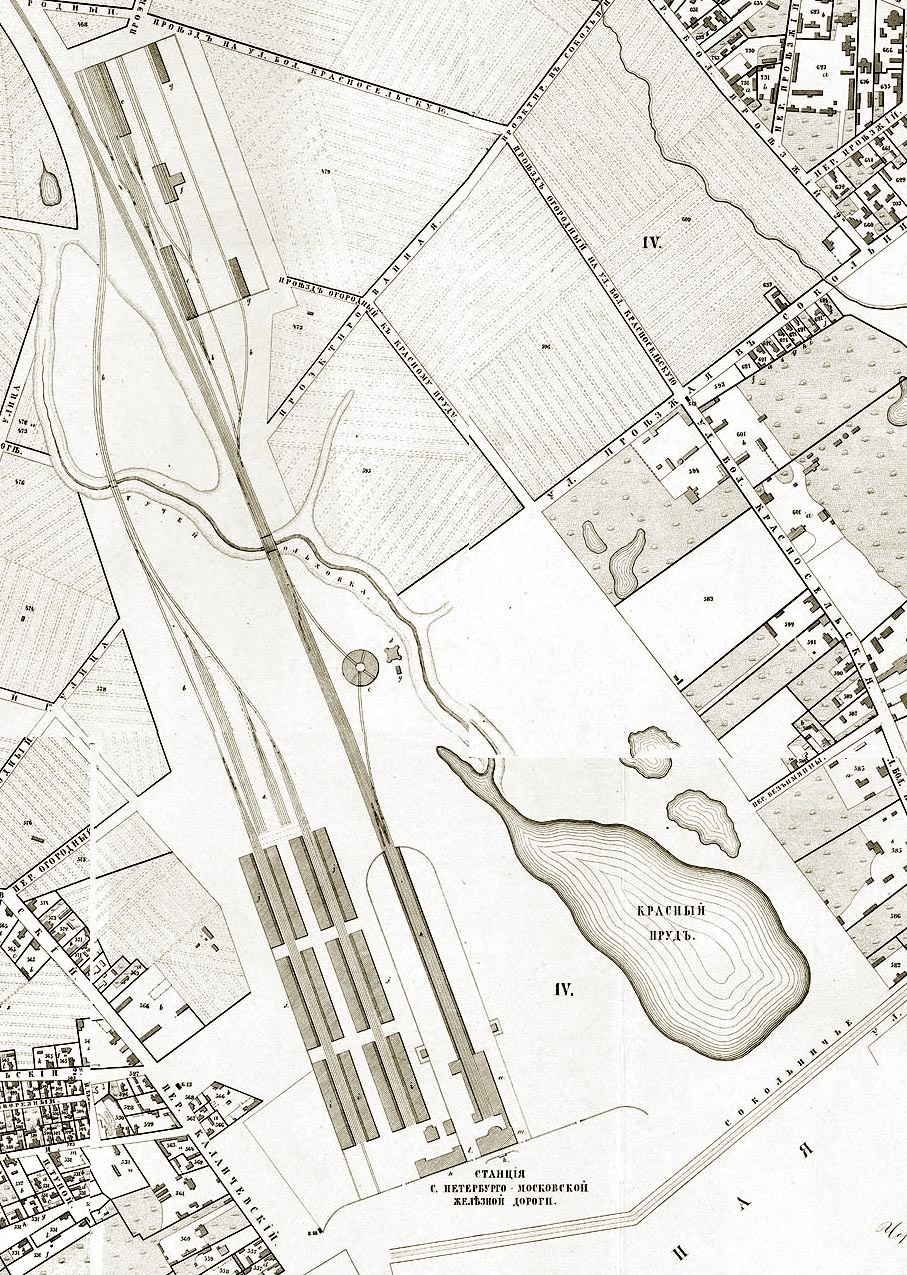
1852 map of Moscow's first rail terminal, present-day Leningradsky Rail Terminal, with roundhouse and yards, and the pond on Olkhovets Creek

In 1851, the state completed the first mainline railroad from St. Petersburg to Moscow, and set up the extant terminal building, designed by Konstantin Thon, west of the pond. This remote site was chosen due to high costs of land in the city and fear of accidental fire.

More railroads followed with Yaroslavsky Rail Terminal (1862, rebuilt in the 1900s by Fyodor Schechtel and expanded by Lev Kekushev), Kazansky Rail Terminal (1864, rebuilt in the 1910s by Alexey Shchusev and expanded after World War II), and the line leading to Kursky Rail Terminal (1870s) with its own station on an overpass. The pond was filled only in the 1900s, in line with Schectel's project. New terminals were inevitably encircled with rail yards, workshops, warehouses and connecting lines, thus over a half of Krasnoselsky District is now occupied by railroad facilities.

In 1935, the first line of Moscow Metro reached Komsomolskaya Square; its service yard was placed east of Yaroslavsky Terminal. At the same time Commissariat of Railroads took over the lands between the terminals and Garden Ring and set up an ambitious office construction program, starting with Ivan Fomin's constructivist "Tank Engine Building", which still houses the headquarters of Russian Railways. In 1947–1952, Railways acquired two skyscrapers—a mixed residential and office tower in Red Gates Square and Hilton Moscow Leningradskaya Hotel in Komsomoskaya Square.

In the 1980s, the blocks north-west from these two towers were torn down and rebuilt with Leonid Brezhnev-era high-rise offices. Former Domnikovskaya Street in this office compound, widened to 8–10 lanes, is now named after Andrei Sakharov.

== Economy ==
United Aircraft Corporation has its head office in the district.

== Education ==
The Lycée Français Alexandre Dumas de Moscou, a French international school, is located in the district.

== Sources ==
- (in Russian) П. В. Сытин, "Из истории московских улиц", М. 1948
