= Meshchansky District =

District of Moscow, Russia

Coordinates: 55°46′33″N 37°37′39″E

Meshchansky District on the map of Moscow

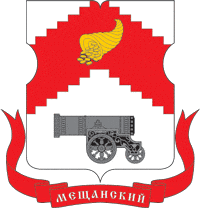
Coat of arms of Meshchansky District

Meshchansky District (Russian: Мещанский район) is a district of Central Administrative Okrug of the federal city of Moscow, Russia. Population: 58,002 (2010 Census); 56,077 (2002 Census).

The district extends due north from Kitai-gorod to Kamer-Kollezhsky Val. Western boundary with Tverskoy District follows the track of Neglinnaya River (Neglinnaya Street, Tsvetnoy Boulevard, Samotechnaya Street, Soviet Army Street). Eastern boundary with Krasnoselsky District follows Bolshaya Lubyanka Street and Sretenka Street, then one block east from Mira Avenue. The Lubyanka Building lies in the Meshchansky District.

The district contains part of Kuznetsky Most Street, Rozhdestvensky monastery and Rozhdestvensky Boulevard, Olympic Stadium and a row of neoclassical, palace-like buildings north from the Garden Ring. It houses headquarters of Federal Security Service in Lubyanka Square, Central Bank of the Russian Federation, FAPSI and other government agencies as well as the Sretensky Monastery and the Sretensky Theological Academy.

== Etymology ==
Meshchane in the Russian Empire denoted a social estate of poor town residents who did not qualify as merchants or civil servants; in modern Russian, it is a pejorative name for a narrow-minded philistine. Meschansky District acquired its name earlier, in the second half of 17th century, through the Ukrainians and Belarusians abducted from their hometowns in the course of Russo-Polish War (1654–1667). These people settled north from present-day Garden Ring, reaching 692 households by 1682 (Sytin, p. 296). In their languages, meshchane meant simply "town people", "the locals", without negative connotation; the name of Meshchanskaya sloboda persists to date.

Symbols on the coat of arms denote:

- Golden horn of plenty - the Central Bank
- Red bridge - Kuznetsky Most
- The cannon - old Moscow Armoury (пушечный двор) in present-day Pushechnaya Street

== Parks and squares ==
Festivalny Park is a park in the northwestern part of the district. Established in 1936 on the site of the abolished Lazarevskoye Cemetery, it was initially named "Children's Park of F.E. Dzerzhinsky." Renamed "Festivalny" in 1985 after renovations, the park fell into decline in the 2000s before being revitalized in 2017 at the request of local residents. The renewed space features quiet relaxation zones, walking paths, sports facilities (including a refurbished basketball court, cycling track, outdoor fitness equipment, and ping-pong tables), and playgrounds (one equipped with a zip line). The park’s stage was also renovated. Additional improvements include a new pigeon house, an expanded dog-walking area, and a new sandy, low-impact bridle path connecting to the nearby hippodrome.

Tsvetnoy Boulevard Square is a landscaped recreational area between Trubnaya Square and the Garden Ring. A popular promenade and entertainment hub since the 19th century, it is recognized as a regional cultural heritage site. The square houses several monuments: the "Grateful Russia to the Soldiers of Law Enforcement Fallen in the Line of Duty" memorial, the sculptural composition "Song," and the clown-themed fountain ensemble "Clowns."

Catherine Park, situated between Sovetskoy Armii Street, Olympic Avenue, and Durova Street, originated in the late 18th century as the estate park of Count V.S. Saltykov. Renamed after the Catherine Institute for Noble Maidens, established here in the early 19th century, it was later known as the Park of the Central House of the Soviet Army during the Soviet era. Today, it retains its historical name and is designated a landscape art monument. The park’s centerpiece is a 1.9-hectare pond, surrounded by ancient oaks and a 200-year-old willow.

Rizhsky Station Square, once a green space on Rizhskaya Square, was developed in the 1930s. Its focal point was a fountain with a caravel sculpture, installed in 2007. The square was dismantled during the construction of the Rizhskaya station on the Bolshaya Koltsevaya metro line. Plans to restore the park area are pending the station’s completion.

Trubnaya Street Square, a public space created in 2013 on a vacant lot near house No. 15, was part of Moscow’s "People’s Park" initiative. It initially featured walking paths, benches, and light installations. A 2017 renovation added a pump track, climbing wall, all-weather playground, and outdoor exercise equipment.

Samotyozhny Boulevard, a 3.8-hectare green zone between Samotyozhnaya Street and Olympic Avenue, hosts two monuments: a 1953 bust of pilot Vitaly Ivanovich Popkov and a 1960 statue of Marshal Fyodor Ivanovich Tolbukhin.

Other notable green spaces in the district include Catherine Square, Suvorov Square Garden, and Rozhdestvensky Boulevard (part of the Boulevard Ring).

== Gardens ==
The Moscow State University Botanical Garden "Aptekarsky Ogorod" is the oldest botanical garden in Russia. Founded by Peter the Great in 1706 for the cultivation of medicinal herbs, it is now a branch of the Moscow State University Botanical Garden. Recognized as a historical and cultural landmark of Moscow, as well as a monument of landscape art, the garden features over a dozen collections and exhibitions. It is home to trees more than 250 years old, including a larch tree that, according to legend, was planted by Peter the Great himself.

== Gallery ==
North from Garden Ring: four historical buildings in a row are divided between Meshchansky and Maryina Roshcha District

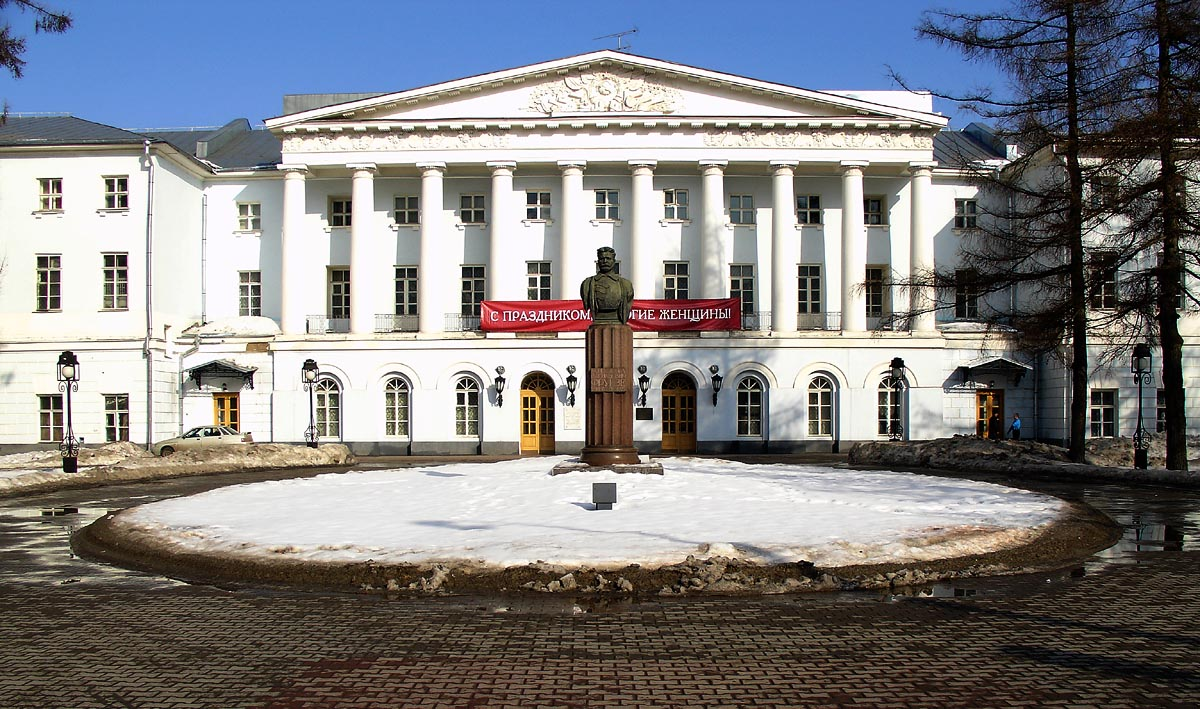
Catherine's Institute, present-day House of Culture of Russian Army

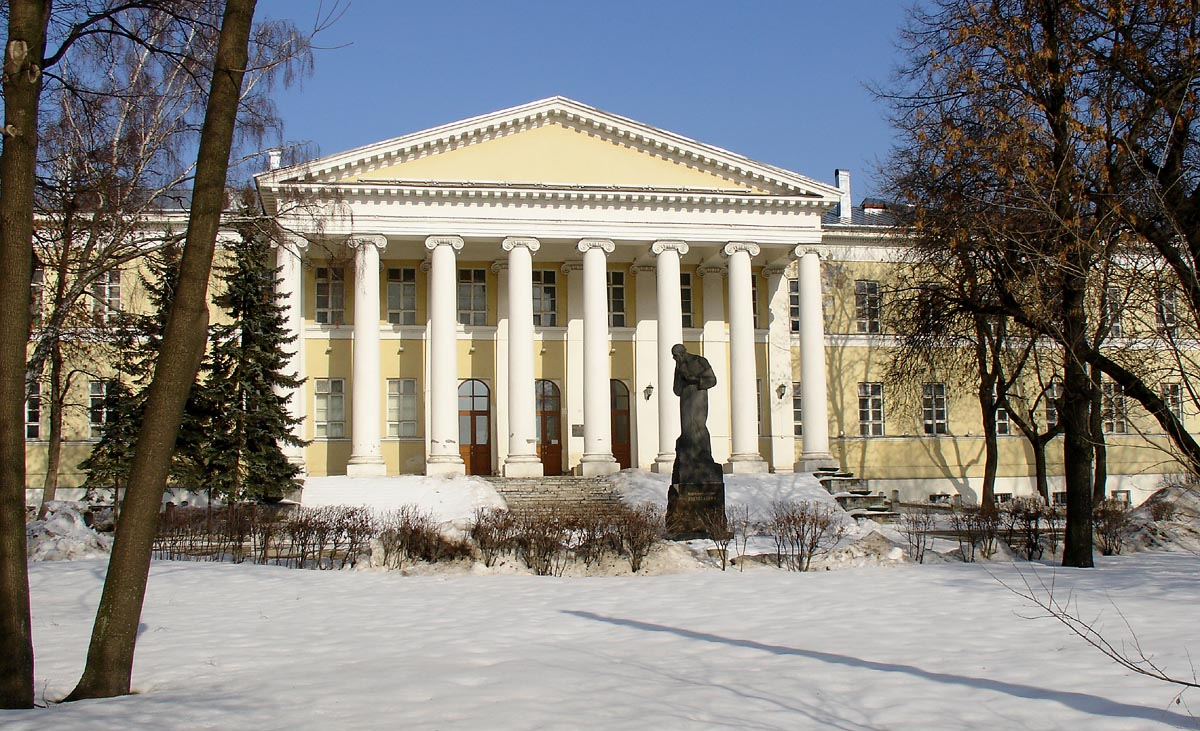
Mariinsky Hospital, birthplace of Fyodor Dostoyevsky, and 1918 monument to Dostoyevsky

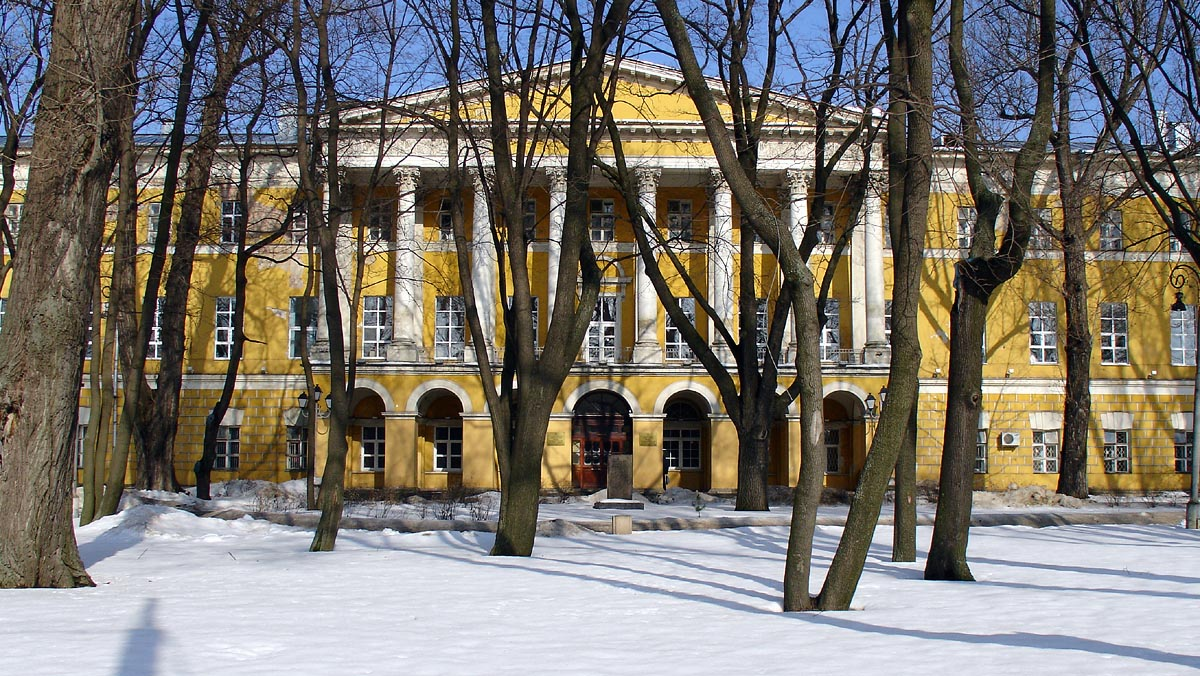
Alexander's Institute, also a public hospital

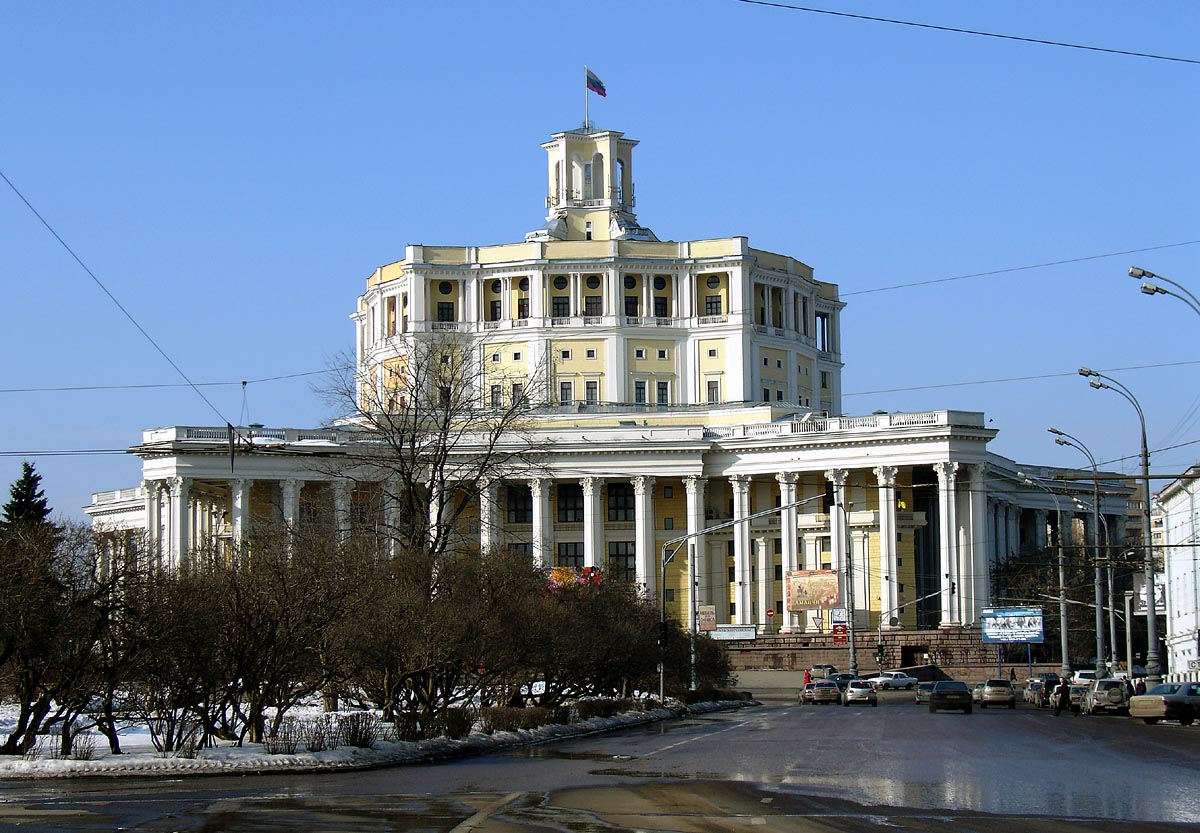
Russian Army Theater
