= Konstantin Kosiakin =

Russian politician

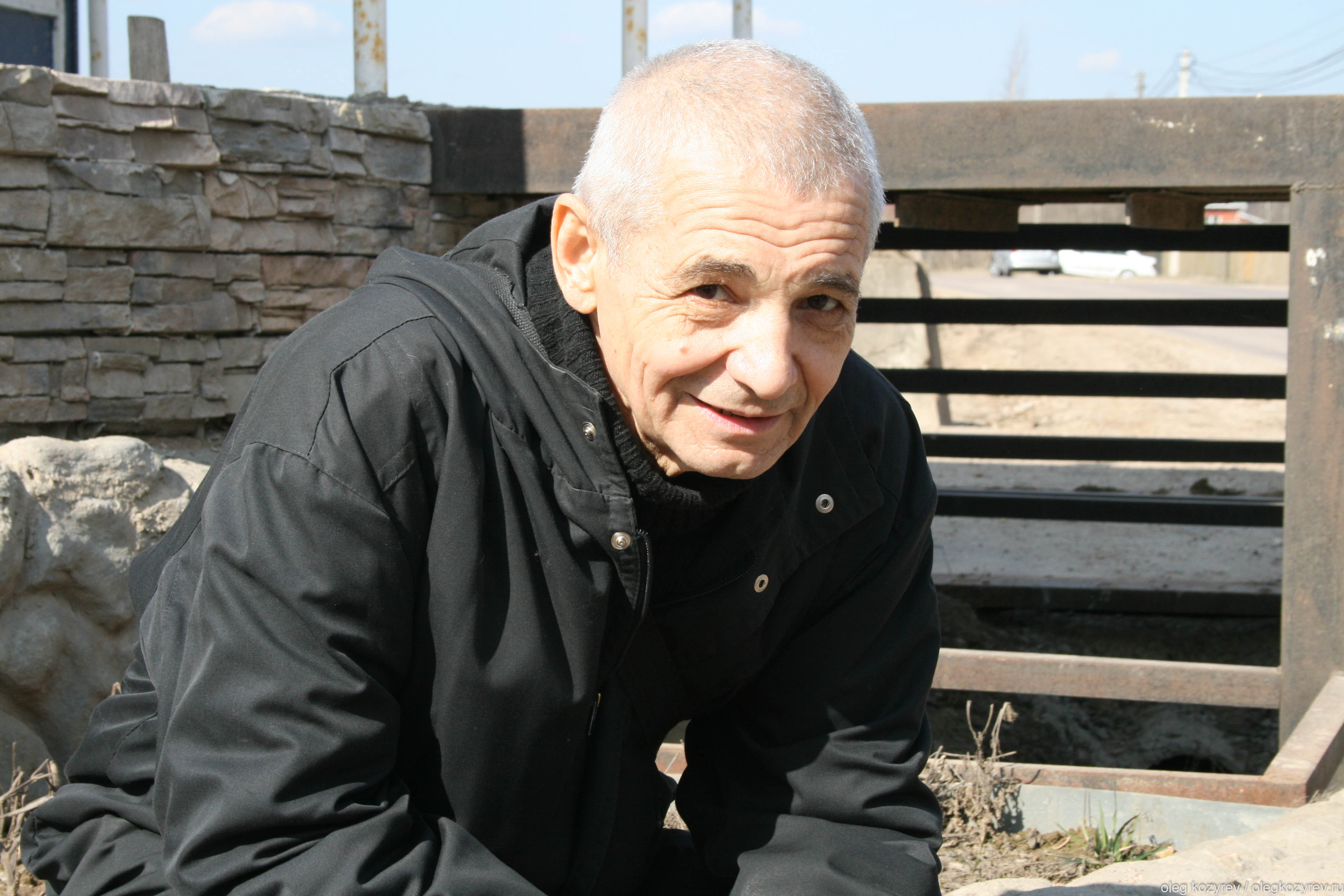
Konstantin Kosiakin in 2011

Konstantin Yuryevich Kosiakin (Russian:Константин Юрьевич Косякин; 18 January 1947 – 10 August 2013) was a Russian leftist politician, a member of the National Assembly of the Other Russia. He was a member of the council and the executive committee of the Left Front, coordinator of the Mossovet movement, one of the organizers of the Strategy-31 protests, Day of Wrath, and others.
