= List of Russian Americans =

This is a list of notable Russian Americans, including both original immigrants who obtained American citizenship and their American descendants.

To be included in this list, the person must have a Wikipedia article showing they are Russian American or must have references showing they are Russian American and are notable.

== Arts ==
=== Performance ===
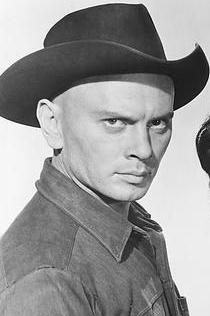
Yul Brynner

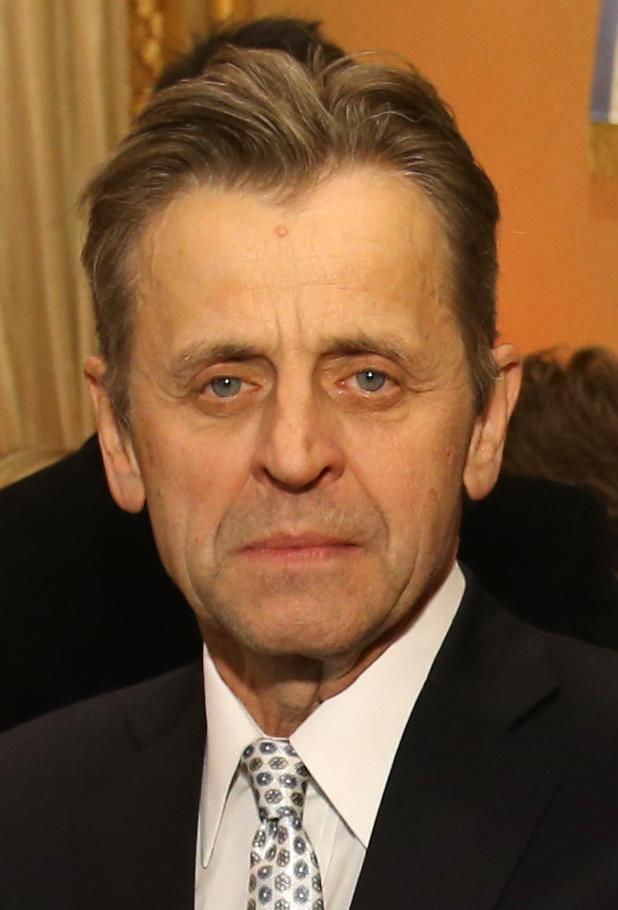
Mikhail Baryshnikov

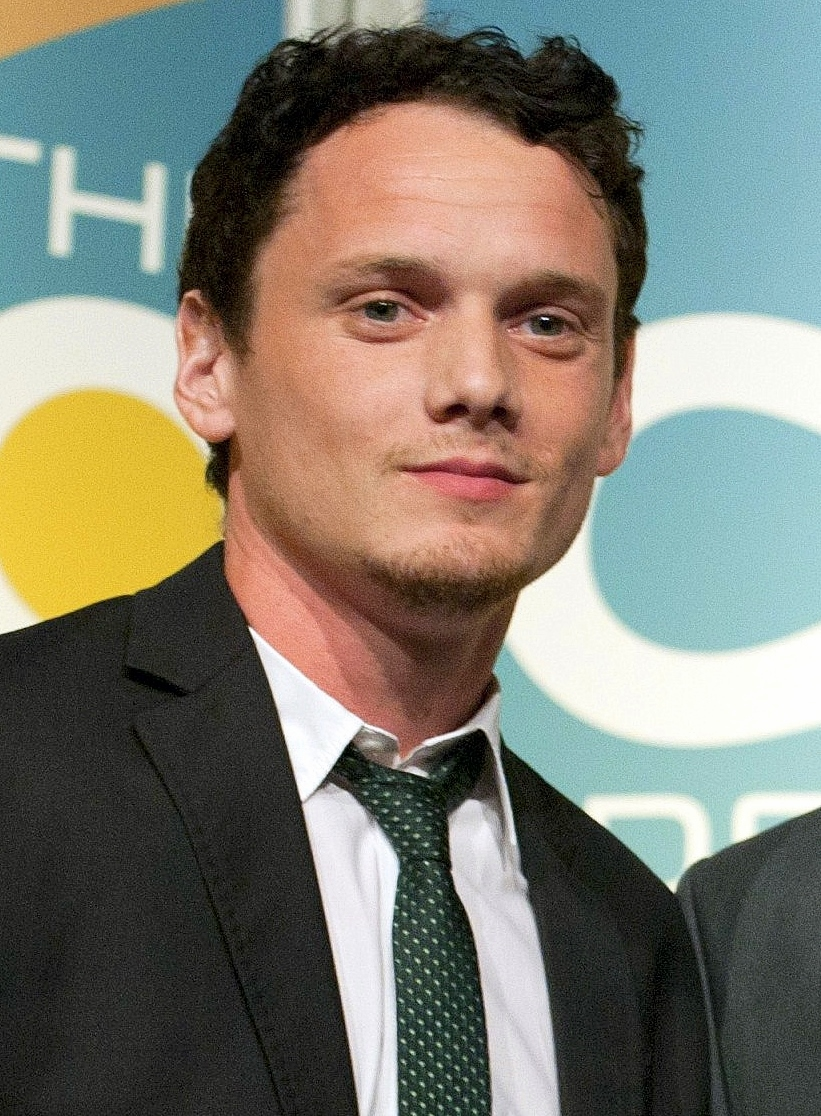
Anton Yelchin

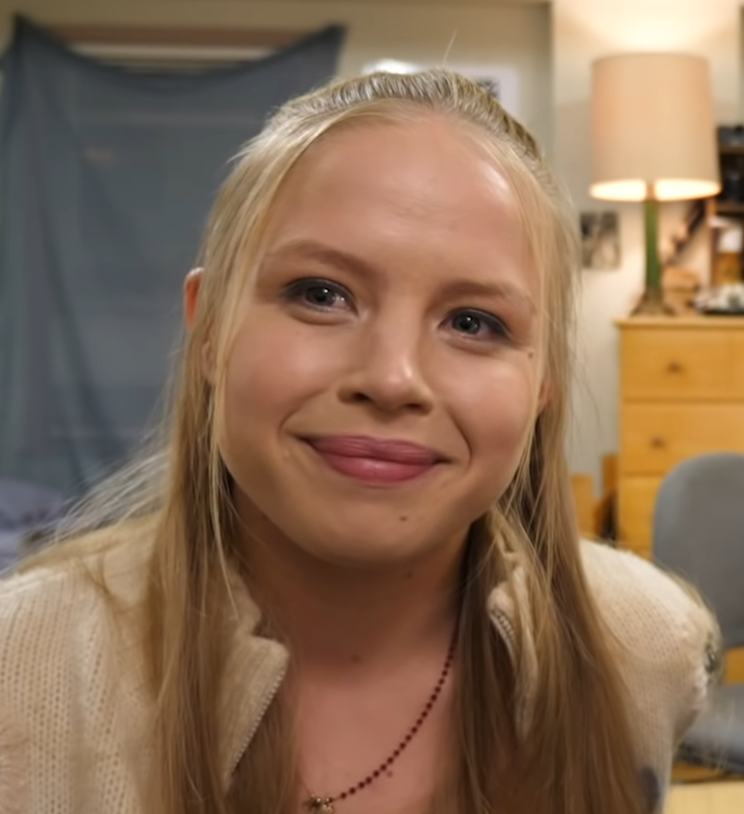
Sofia Vassilieva

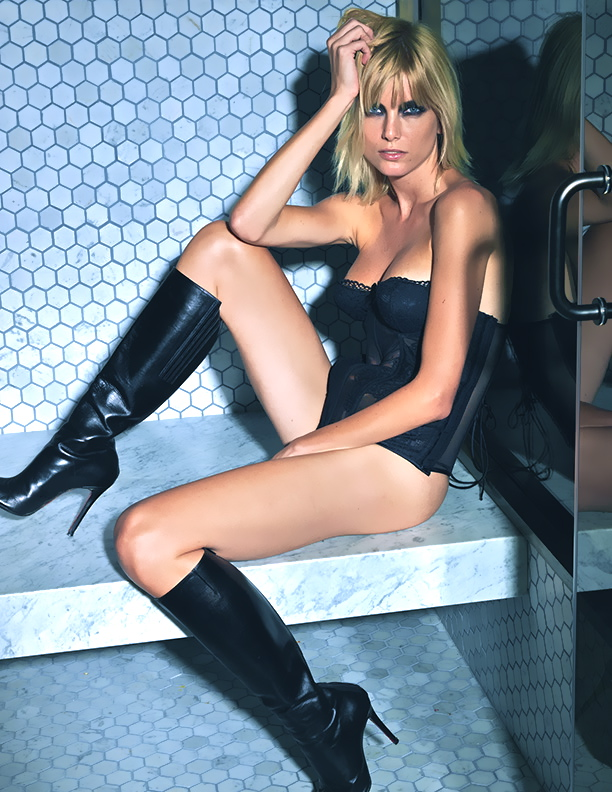
Eugenia Kuzmina

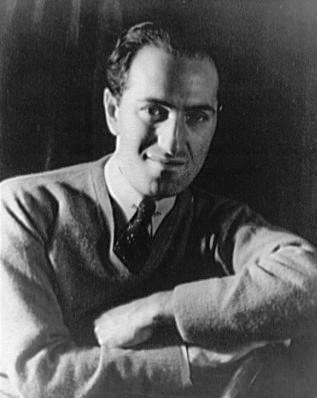
George Gershwin

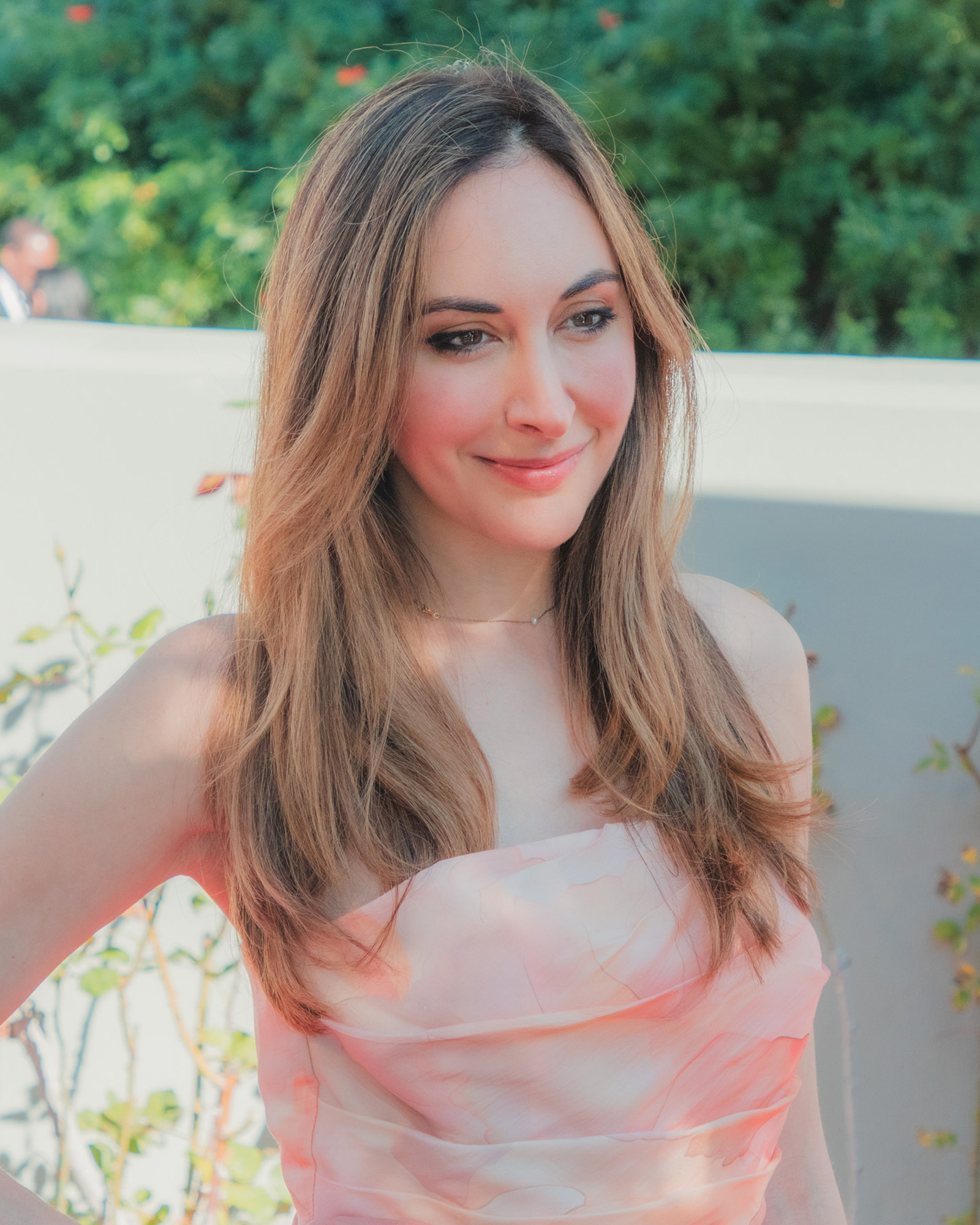
Sarah Natochenny

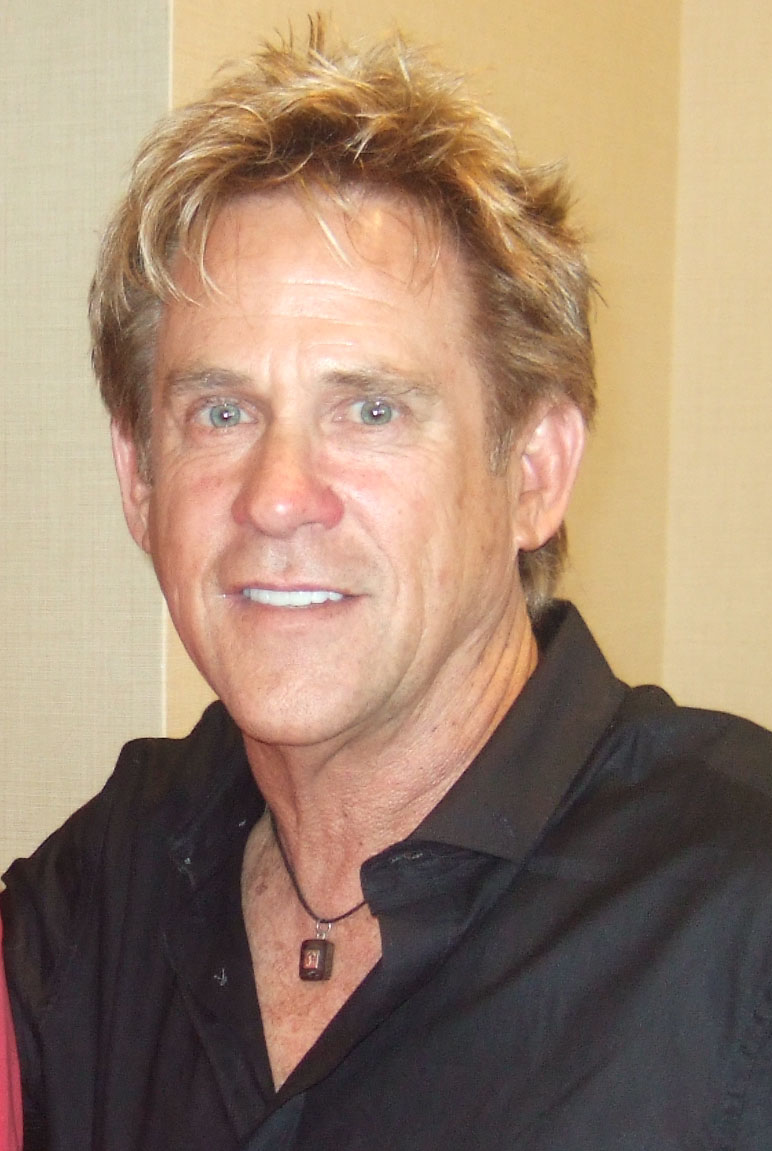
Michael Dudikoff

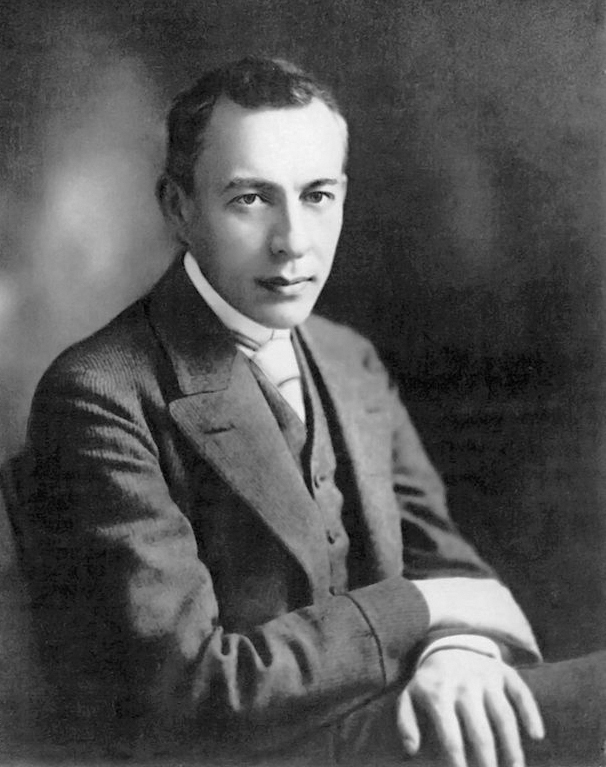
Sergei Rachmaninoff

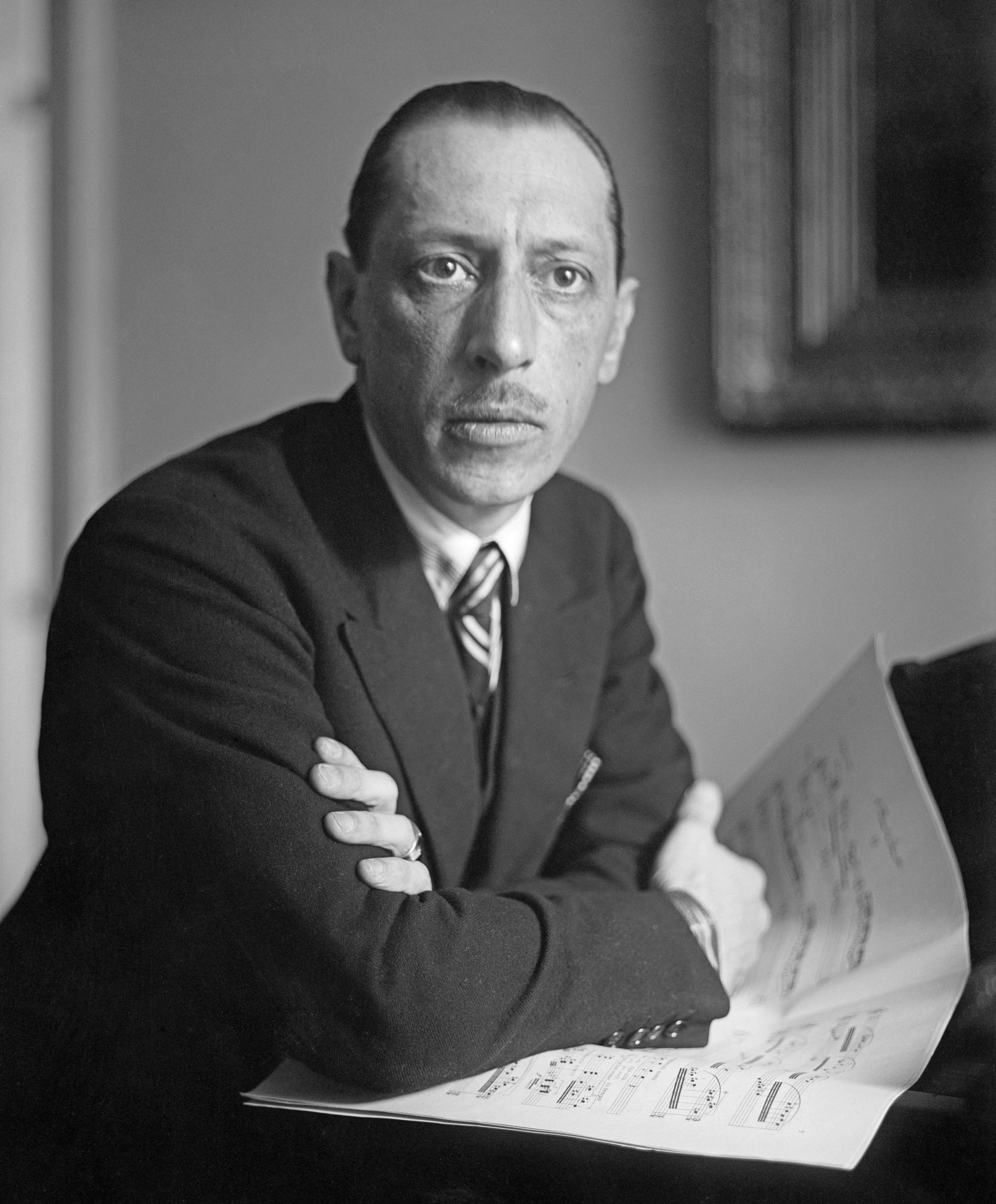
Igor Stravinsky

- Paul Abrahamian (born 1993), reality television personality, of Russian and Armenian descent
- Odessa Adlon (born 2000), actress, has Russian Jewish ancestry through her mother
- Dianna Agron (born 1986), actress, father of Russian Jewish ancestry
- Monique Alexander (born 1982), pornographic actress, actress and model
- Woody Allen (born 1935), actor, writer, director, and musician, his mother was of Russian Jewish ancestry.
- Alan Arkin (1934–2023), actor, director, producer, and screenwriter, grandparents were Russian Jewish, Ukrainian Jewish and German Jewish immigrants
- René Auberjonois (1940–2019), Tony Award-winning character actor (and grandson of the painter), best known for his early 1980s role as Clayton Endicott III on the television show Benson and his role as Odo on Star Trek: Deep Space Nine
- Olga Baclanova (1893–1974), Russian-born actress
- Eric Balfour (born 1977), actor, portraying Milo Pressman in 24, of Russian Jewish descent
- Sasha Barrese (born 1981), actress of Irish, Dutch, American Indian, and Russian descent
- Anna Baryshnikov (born 1992), actress, daughter of Mikhail Baryshnikov
- Mikhail Baryshnikov (born 1948), dancer and actor
- Shura Baryshnikov (born 1981), dancer, choreographer, actress
- Michael Bay (born 1965), film director and producer, grandfather was a Russian Jewish immigrant
- Irving Berlin (1888–1989), composer and songwriter, Russian Jewish immigrant
- Emma Berman (born 2008), actress, of Russian Jewish descent
- Jack Black (born 1969), actor, comedian, musician, mother of Russian Jewish descent
- Michael Bolton (born 1953), singer, all of his grandparents were Jewish immigrants from Russia
- Jon Bon Jovi (born 1962), singer-songwriter, mother of partial Russian descent
- Alexey Brodovitch (1898–1971), the pioneer of graphic design, created a prototype of the modern glossy magazine about fashion
- Agnes Bruckner (born 1985), actress, mother has Russian background
- Yul Brynner (1920–1985), Russian-born actor and Academy Award winner
- Cheryl Burke (born 1984), professional dancer known for starring on the television series Dancing with the Stars, father of Russian Jewish descent
- Semyon Bychkov (born 1952), conductor
- Amanda Bynes (born 1986), actress, mother of Russian Jewish descent
- Dove Cameron (born 1996), actress, has partial Russian descent
- Eddie Cantor (1892–1964), actor and dancer, parents were Russian Jewish immigrants
- Timothée Chalamet (born 1995), actor, mother of Russian Jewish descent
- Michael Chekhov (1891–1955), Russian-born actor and dancer
- Lily Collins (born 1989), actress, maternal grandfather of Russian Jewish descent
- Jennifer Connelly (born 1970), actress, mother of Russian Jewish and Polish Jewish descent
- David Copperfield (born 1956), illusionist and stage magician, paternal grandparents were Russian Jewish immigrants
- Lydia Cornell (born Lydia Korniloff, 1953), actress, father of Russian descent
- Eric Dane (1972-2026), actor, of partial Russian-Jewish descent
- Gavin DeGraw (born 1977), musician, mother of Russian Jewish descent
- Alexis Denisof (born 1966), actor, father of mostly Russian ancestry
- Kat Dennings (born 1986), actress, grandparents were Russian Jewish immigrants
- Leonardo DiCaprio (born 1974), actor, Academy Award winner, maternal grandmother was Russian
- Jim Downey (born 1952), comedy writer
- Michael Dudikoff (born 1954), actor, father was an immigrant from Russia
- Aaron Eckhart (born 1968), actor, father of Volga German descent
- Ansel Elgort (born 1994), actor, father of Russian-Jewish descent
- Val Emmich (born 1979), singer-songwriter and actor of Italian, Russian, and German ancestry
- Evidence, real name Michael Perretta (born 1976), American hip hop musician, Russian mother
- Peter Falk (1927–2011), actor, born to a Polish Jewish father and a Russian Jewish mother
- Tina Fey (born 1970), actress and comedian, father of part-Russian descent
- Larry Fine (1902–1975), actor, comedian, musician and member of the Three Stooges, parents were Russian Jewish immigrants
- Carrie Fisher (1956–2016), actress, father of Russian Jewish descent
- Michel Fokine (1880–1942), dancer and choreographer
- Olga Fonda (born 1982), actress and model
- Harrison Ford (born 1942), actor, mother of Russian Jewish descent
- Dave Franco (born 1985), actor, mother of Russian Jewish descent
- James Franco (born 1978), actor, mother of Russian Jewish descent
- Crispin Freeman (born 1972), voice actor, father of Russian Jewish descent
- Cassidy Freeman (born 1982), actress and musician, sister of voice actor Crispin Freeman, father of Russian Jewish descent
- Isabelle Fuhrman (born 1997), actress (mother, Elena Fuhrman, is a Russian Jewish immigrant, father is of Russian Jewish descent)
- Drew Fuller (born 1980), actor of Russian, Scottish and English heritage
- Edward Furlong (born 1977), actor, the star of such film as Terminator 2: Judgment Day, Pet Sematary Two and American History X, father of Russian origin
- George Gaynes (1917–2016), actor and singer of Dutch (father), Russian and Finnish (mother) descent
- Galen Gering (born 1971), actor of Russian Jewish (father) and Basque Spanish (mother) descent
- George Gershwin (1898–1937), composer and pianist, author of Rhapsody in Blue, Russian Jewish and Ukrainian Jewish ancestry
- Alexander Godunov (1949–1995), dancer and choreographer
- Katerina Graham (born 1989), actress, singer, record producer, dancer, and model, mother of Russian Jewish ancestry
- Seth Green (born 1974), actor, part Russian Jewish ancestry
- Jake Gyllenhaal (born 1980), mother Naomi Foner Gyllenhaal of Russian Jewish descent
- Maggie Gyllenhaal (born 1977), mother Naomi Foner Gyllenhaal of Russian Jewish descent
- Kyle Gallner (born 1986) actor whose paternal grandparents were both from Russian Jewish immigrant families.
- Armie Hammer (born 1986), actor, father of part Russian Jewish/Russian descent
- Juliana Harkavy (born 1985), actress, has Russian ancestors
- Ben Harper (born 1969), singer-songwriter, Jewish mother of Russian and Lithuanian ancestry
- Barbara Hershey (born 1948), actress, father of Russian Jewish and Hungarian Jewish descent
- Damian Hurley (born 2002), actor
- Fedor Jeftichew (1868–1904), freak show attraction nicknamed "Jojo the dog-faced man" and a star of the Barnum Circus
- Kidada Jones (born 1974), actress, model, and fashion designer, daughter of actress Peggy Lipton and musician Quincy Jones; mother of Russian Jewish descent
- Rashida Jones (born 1976), actress, model, and musician, daughter of actress Peggy Lipton, mother of Russian Jewish descent
- Milla Jovovich (born 1975), actress and model, born in Kyiv to a Russian mother and a Serbian father
- Stacy Kamano (born 1974), actress of German, Russian, Polish and Japanese descent
- Lila Kedrova (1909–2000), Russian-born French-American actress, won Academy Award for Best Supporting Actress
- Olga Kern (born 1975), Russian-born classical pianist, won the 11th Van Cliburn International Piano Competition, direct family ties to both Rachmaninov and Tchaikovsky
- Justin Kirk (born 1969), stage and film actor, mother of Russian Jewish descent
- Charles Klapow (born 1980), choreographer and dance instructor, Emmy Award winner, father of Russian origin
- Christopher Knight (born 1957), actor
- Walter Koenig (1936–2026), actor and screenwriter, parents were Russian Jewish immigrants
- Theodore Kosloff (1882–1956), dancer and choreographer
- Lenny Kravitz (born 1964), singer, father of Russian Jewish descent
- Zoë Kravitz (born 1988), actress, singer and model daughter of Lenny Kravitz, both parents of half Russian Jewish descent
- Nick Kroll (born 1978), actor and comedian
- Feodor Lark (born 1997), Russian-born television actor
- Jennifer Jason Leigh (born 1962), actress, father of Russian Jewish descent
- Logan Lerman (born 1992), actor, of Russian Jewish, Polish Jewish, and Lithuanian Jewish descent
- Margarita Levieva (born 1980), actress and professional gymnast, Russian Jewish immigrant
- Peggy Lipton (1946–2019), actress, of Russian Jewish ancestry
- Karina Lombard (born 1969), actress and singer of Lakota Sioux, Russian, Italian and Swiss descent
- Annet Mahendru (born 1985), actress, mother of Russian descent
- James Maslow (born 1990), actor and singer of Scots-Irish, English, and Russian Jewish descent
- Marlee Matlin (born 1965), Academy Award-winning actress of Russian Jewish descent
- Mikey Madison (born 1999), Academy Award-winning actress of three quarters Ashkenazi Jewish ancestry (from Poland, Lithuania, Russia, and Germany).
- Kayla Maisonet (born 1999) American actress of Russian and Puerto Rican descent
- Walter Matthau (1920–2000), actor and comedian, parents were Russian Jewish immigrants
- Blake Michael (born 1996), actor of Russian Jewish descent
- Wentworth Miller (born 1972), actor, mother of partial Russian descent
- Eugene Mirman (born 1974), actor, Russian Jewish immigrant
- Taylor Momsen (born 1993), actress, musician and model, fronts the rock band The Pretty Reckless
- Mandy Moore (born 1984), actress, singer, of Russian Jewish descent (from her maternal grandfather)
- Vic Morrow (1929–1982), actor, parents were Russian Jewish immigrants
- Sarah Natochenny (born 1987), voice actress
- Alla Nazimova (1879–1945), theater and film actress, Russian Jewish immigrant
- Alexander Nevsky (born 1971), actor, producer, writer, bodybuilder, immigrant from Russia
- Nancy Novotny (born 1963), voice actress, radio personality
- Pat O'Brien (born 1965), guitarist, half Russian
- Wyatt Oleff (born 2004), actor of Russian Jewish ancestry. His surname, originally spelled Olefsky, comes from his Russian Jewish heritage.
- Larisa Oleynik (born 1981), actress (Mad Men, 3rd Rock from the Sun), father of Russian descent
- Piotr Pakhomkin (born 1985), guitarist, half Russian
- Mandy Patinkin (born 1952), actor and singer, of Russian Jewish descent
- Sean Penn (born 1960), two-time Academy Award winning actor, paternal grandparents were Russian Jewish and Lithuanian Jewish immigrants
- Lee Philips (1927–1999) (born Leon Friedman), parents were Russian Jewish immigrants
- Joaquin Phoenix (born 1974), actor, mother has Russian Jewish and Hungarian Jewish ancestry
- River Phoenix (1970–1993), actor, mother has Russian Jewish and Hungarian Jewish ancestry
- Bronson Pinchot (born 1959), actor, best known for Perfect Strangers; father, born Henry Poncharavsky, is of Russian ancestry
- Alexander Polinsky (born 1974), actor, father is of Russian Jewish descent
- Natalie Portman (born 1981), Israeli-born actress, of Russian Jewish, Polish Jewish, Romanian Jewish, and Austrian Jewish ancestry
- Mike Portnoy (born 1967), musician, founding member of American heavy metal band Dream Theater
- Ryan Potter (born 1995), actor, mother of Russian Jewish descent
- Princess Superstar (born 1971), musician, father of Russian Jewish descent
- Sergei Rachmaninoff (1873–1943), Russian-born composer who immigrated to the US in 1918 and lived there until his death in 1943; acquired U.S. citizenship in 1943
- Sam Raimi (born 1959), Jewish American film, producer, actor and writer, whose parents came from Russia and Hungary
- Ted Raimi (born 1965), actor and brother of Sam Raimi, star of Xena: Warrior Princess
- Raven (born 1979), drag queen and reality-television star
- Joan Rivers (1933–2014), comedian, parents were Russian Jewish immigrants
- Sasha Roiz (born 1973), Russian Jewish immigrant (born in Tel Aviv, Israel)
- Natalya Rudakova (born 1985), actress
- Paul Rudd (born 1969), American actor of Russian Jewish ancestry
- Olesya Rulin (born 1986), Russian-born actress and singer
- Melanie Safka-Schekeryk (born 1947), folk singer, father of Russian and Ukrainian ancestry
- Steven Seagal (born 1952), actor, father of Russian Jewish descent
- Jack Shaindlin (1909–1978), composer, musical director of the March of Time newsreel series, Crimean Jewish immigrant
- Peter Shukoff (born 1979), YouTuber, co-founded ERB, of Russian descent
- Jenny Slate (born 1982), actress, comedian and author, of Russian Jewish origin
- Sasha Alex Sloan (born 1995), singer-songwriter, father of Russian descent
- Regina Spektor (born 1980), singer-songwriter and pianist, Russian Jewish immigrant
- Leonard Stone (1927–2011), father was a Russian Jewish immigrant
- Igor Stravinsky (1882–1971), composer and pianist
- Michael Strong (1918–1980) (born Cecil Natapoff), parents were Russian Jewish immigrants
- Tara Strong (born 1973), Canadian-born actor whose family is of Russian Jewish descent
- Gene Stupnitsky (born 1977), screenwriter, Ukrainian Jewish immigrant
- Svoy (born 1980), Russian-born songwriter/producer for Universal Music Group
- Max Terr (1889–1951), Russian-born pianist, arranger, bandleader and film composer
- Tonearm (Ilia Bis), performance musician
- Michelle Trachtenberg (1985-2025), television and film actress, mother is a Russian Jewish immigrant
- Sofia Vassilieva (born 1992), actress, parents were Russian immigrants
- Sasha Velour (born 1987), drag queen and winner of RuPaul's Drag Race Season 9
- Gene Wilder (1933–2016), actor, parents were Russian Jewish and Polish Jewish immigrants
- Lana Wood (born 1946), actress, parents were Russian immigrants
- Natalie Wood (1938–1981), Academy Award-nominated actress, won a Golden Globe, parents were Russian immigrants
- Anton Yelchin (1989–2016), actor, Russian Jewish immigrant
- Elena Zoubareva (born 1972), Russian-born opera singer

=== Visual arts ===
- Miya Ando (born 1978), artist
- Alan Arkin (1934–2023), actor, director, producer, and screenwriter, grandparents were Russian Jewish, Ukrainian Jewish and German Jewish immigrants
- Andrey Avinoff (1884–1949), artist and painter
- Irwin Chanin (1891–1988), architect and builder, parents were Ukrainian Jewish and Polish Jewish immigrants.
- Dimitri Devyatkin (born 1949), filmmaker and video artist
- Misha Frid (born 1938), Russian-born sculptor, artist, graphic designer and filmmaker, parents were Belarusian Jewish and Lithuanian Jewish immigrants
- Alexander Golitzen (1908–2005), TV and theater art director
- Ilya Kabakov (born 1933), sculptor, painter, installation artist
- Alexander Kaletski, artist and playwright
- Fyodor Kamensky (1836–1913), sculptor
- Louis Lozowick (1892–1973), painter and printmaker, Ukrainian Jewish immigrant
- Ernst Neizvestny (1925–2016), sculptor, painter, graphic artist, and art philosopher, Russian Jewish immigrant
- Elizabeth Shoumatoff (1888–1980), Russian-born portrait painter
- Genndy Tartakovsky (born 1970), animator, parents were Russian Jewish immigrants
- Israel Tsvaygenbaum (born 1961), painter, Russian Jewish immigrant

=== Literature ===
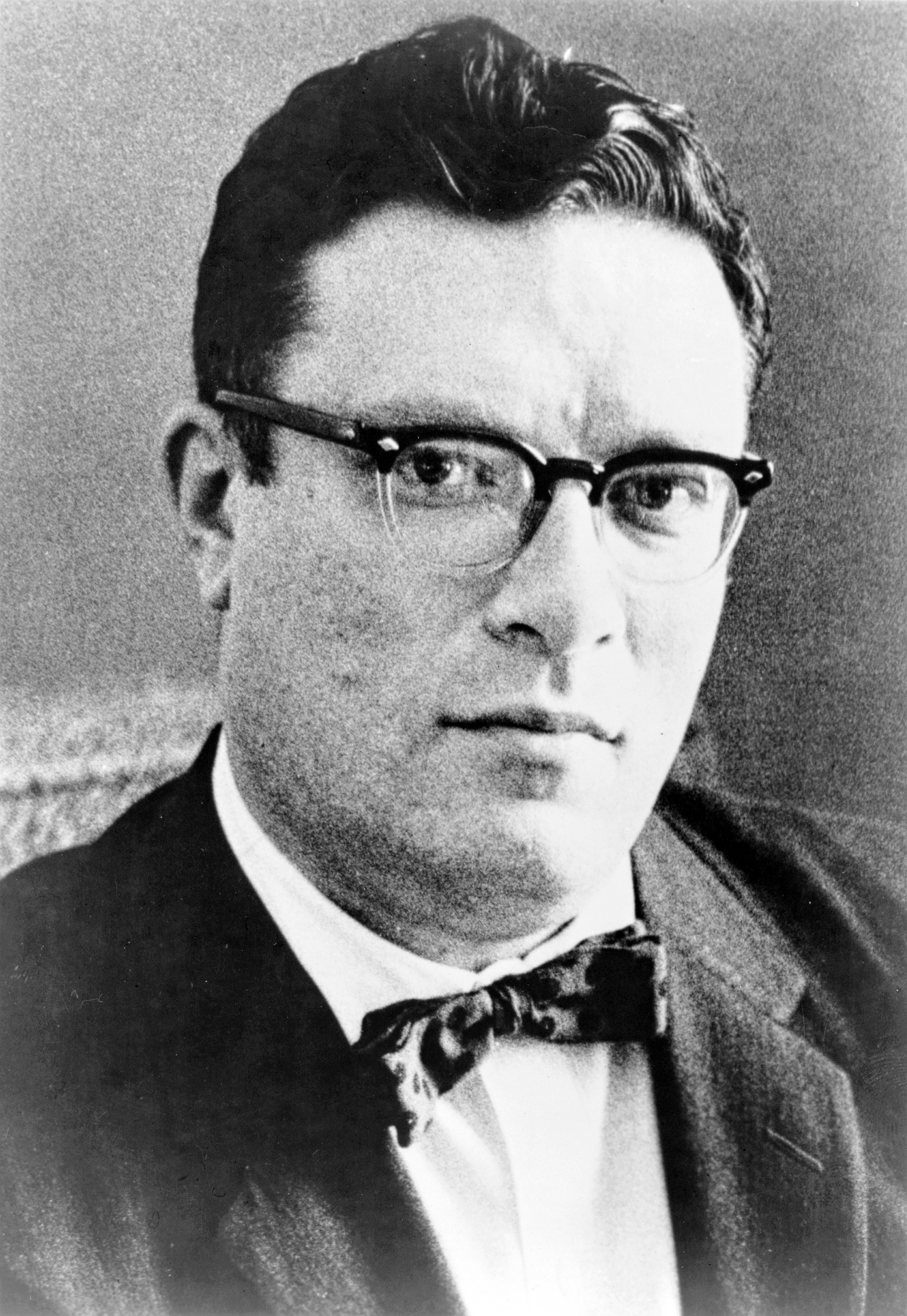
Isaac Asimov

- Isaac Asimov (1920–1992), science fiction writer, Russian Jewish immigrant
- Saul Bellow (1915–2005), Canadian writer of Russian Jewish descent
- Reginald Bretnor (1911–1992), science fiction and fantasy writer, father was a Russian Jewish immigrant
- Joseph Brodsky (1940–1996), Nobel Prize in Literature 1987, Russian Jewish immigrant
- Michael Dorfman (born 1965), writer, Ukrainian Jewish immigrant
- Sergei Dovlatov (1941–1990), Russian-born short story writer and novelist of Jewish and Armenian descent.
- Alexander Genis (born 1953), writer and journalist, Russian Jewish immigrant
- Daniel Genis (born 1978), writer and journalist, parents are Russian Jewish and ethnic Russian immigrants
- Jacob Gordin (1853–1909), playwright, Russian Jewish immigrant
- Michelle Izmaylov (born 1991), science fiction and fantasy writer
- Vladimir Nabokov (1899–1977), Russian-born writer
- Chuck Palahniuk (born 1962), novelist and freelance journalist of French and Ukrainian descent, most known for the award-winning novel Fight Club
- Ayn Rand (1905–1982), born as Alisa Zinovyevna Rosenbaum, writer, philosopher, novelist, Russian Jewish immigrant
- Michael Rostovtzeff (1870–1952), Russian-born writer
- Alex Shoumatoff (born 1946), magazine journalist and author
- Maxim D. Shrayer (born 1967), bilingual author, literary scholar and translator, Russian Jewish immigrant
- David Shrayer-Petrov (born 1936), author, medical scientist, and former refusenik, Russian Jewish immigrant
- Gary Shteyngart (born 1972), writer, Russian Jewish immigrant

== Science ==
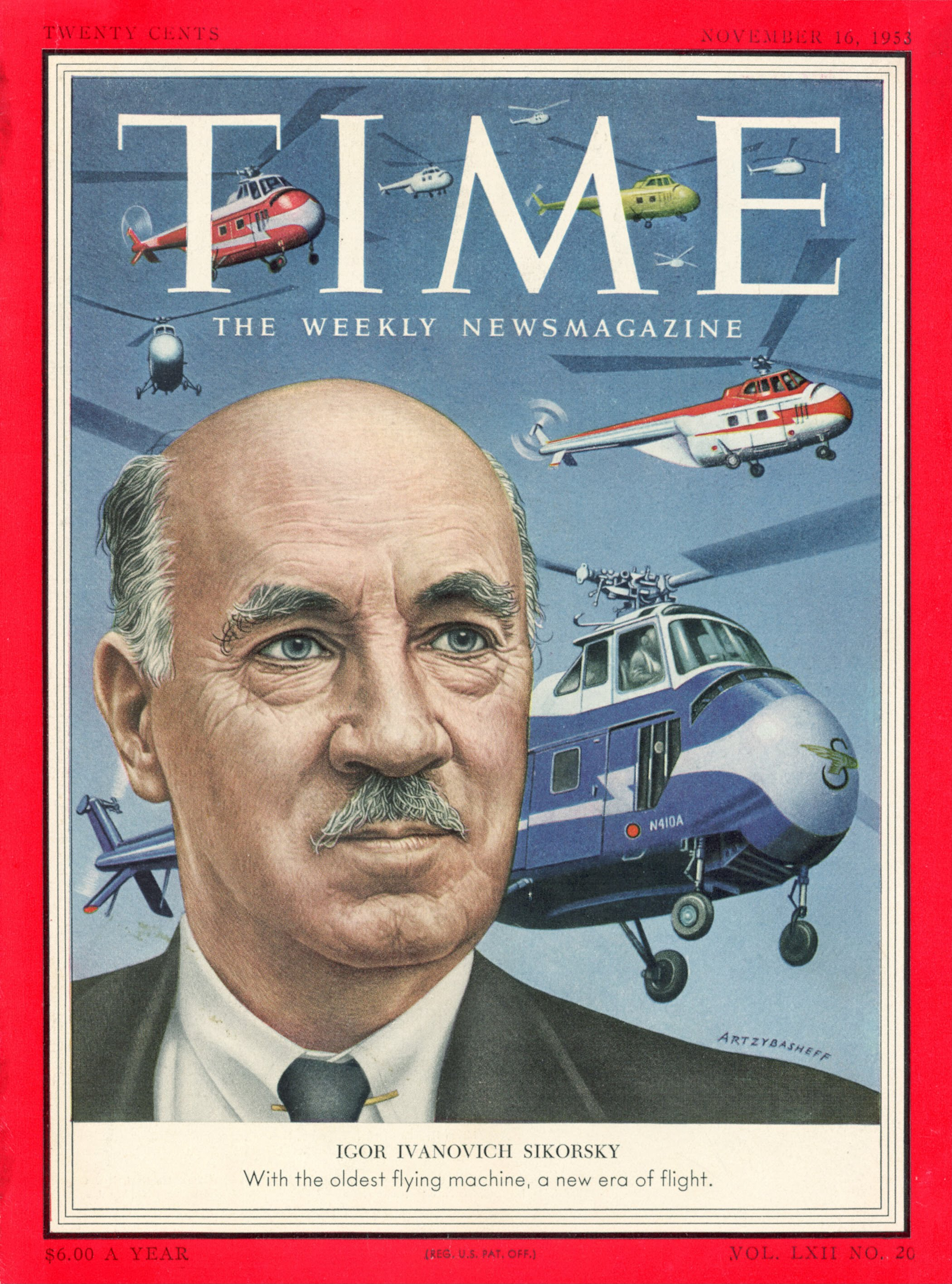
Igor Sikorsky on Time magazine cover, 1953

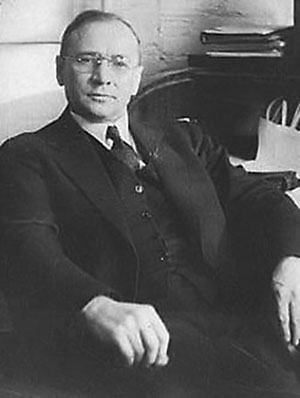
Vladimir K. Zworykin

- Alexei A. Abrikosov (1928–2017), theoretical physicist
- Boris Altshuler (born 1955), contributed to the theory of universal conduction fluctuations
- Andrey Avinoff (1884–1949), museology, lepidoptery, entomology
- Alexander Beilinson (born 1957), mathematician known for contributions to representation theory, algebraic geometry and mathematical physics
- Viktor Belenko (born 1947), aerospace engineer, former Soviet Air Force pilot
- Alexander Bolonkin (1933–2020), cybernetician
- Lera Boroditsky (born 1976), cognitive scientist
- Theodosius Dobzhansky (1900–1975), biologist
- Alexei L. Efros (born 1938), physicist, received the Oliver E. Buckley Condensed Matter Prize
- Alexander Esenin-Volpin (1924–2016), mathematician
- Alex Eskin (born 1965), mathematician
- Peter Fireman (born 1863 -1962), chemist, patentist, industrialist, and economist.
- Sergey Fomin (born 1958), mathematician
- Edward Frenkel (born 1968), mathematician
- Lex Fridman (born 1986), computer scientist
- Victor Galitski, physicist, theorist in the areas of condensed matter physics and quantum physics
- George Gamow (1904–1968), astrophysicist, developer of Lemaître's Big Bang theory, theoretical explanation of alpha decay via quantum tunneling
- Dmitri Z. Garbuzov (1940–2006), physicist, was one of the pioneers and inventors of room temperature continuous-wave-operating diode lasers and high-power diode lasers
- Moses Gomberg (1866–1947), founder of radical chemistry
- Lev Gor'kov (1929–2016), pioneering work in the field of superconductivity
- Vladimir Nikolayevich Ipatieff (1867–1952), chemist, important contributions are in the field of petroleum chemistry and catalysts
- Anton Kapustin (born 1971), theoretical physicist
- Morris S. Kharasch (1895–1957), chemistry
- Mikhail Khovanov (born 1972), mathematician
- Sergei Khrushchev (1935–2020), professor and son of former Soviet Premier Nikita Khrushchev
- Olga Kocharovskaya (born 1956), known for her contributions to quantum optics and gamma ray modulation
- Simon Kuznets (1901–1985), economist, statistician, demographer, and economic historian, the winner of 1971 Nobel Memorial Prize in Economic Sciences
- Anatoly Larkin (1932–2005), physicist, discovered collective pinning of magnetic flux in superconductors, predicted paraconductivity, made essential contributions to the theory of weak localization, as well as developed the concept of the Ehrenfest time and its effect on phenomena of quantum chaos
- Andrei Linde (born 1948), developed a theory of cosmological phase transitions, one of the main authors of the inflationary universe theory, as well as the theory of eternal inflation and inflationary multiverse
- Alexander Nikolayevich Lodygin (1847–1923), electrical engineer and inventor, one of inventors of the incandescent light bulb
- Mikhail Lukin (born 1971), theoretical and experimental physicist
- Grigory Margulis (born 1946), mathematician known for his introduction of methods from ergodic theory into diophantine approximation
- Abraham Maslow (1908–1970), psychologist
- Alexander A. Maximow (1874–1928), in the fields of medicine, histology, embryology and hematology
- Alexander Migdal (born 1945), physicist, known for quantum chromodynamics and conformal field theory
- Guenakh Mitselmakher, physicist who contributed to the discovery of GW150914 using his developed conductor
- Andrei Okounkov (born 1969), winner of the Fields Medal (2006)
- Ivan Ostromislensky (1880–1939), chemistry, pharmacy
- Alexey Pajitnov (born 1956), software engineer and video game designer, inventor of Tetris
- Vladimir Pentkovski (1946–2012), researcher who led the team that developed the architecture for the Pentium III processor
- Boris Podolsky (1896–1966), physicist known for EPR paradox
- Alexander M. Polyakov (born 1945), known for contributions to quantum field theory and vacuum angle in QCD
- Gennady Potapenko (1894–1979), radio astronomer
- Nikolay Prokof'ev, physicist, known for his works on theory of supersolids includes the theory of superfluidity of crystalline defects
- Tatiana Proskouriakoff (1909–1985), Russian-American Mayanist
- Ivan Raimi (born 1956), Doctor of Medicine, osteopathic
- Anatol Rapoport (1911–2007), American mathematical psychologist
- Vladimir Rojansky (1900–1981), physicist
- Alexander L. Rosenberg (1946–2012), mathematician
- James Alexander Shohat (1886–1944), mathematician
- David Shrayer-Petrov (born 1936), medical scientist, microbiologist, immunologist, biophage specialist
- Alexander Shulgin (1925–2014), pharmacologist, chemist and drug developer
- Yakov Sinai (born 1935), mathematician known for his work on dynamical systems; recipient of Nemmers Prize, Wolf Prize in Mathematics and Abel Prize
- Mark Stockman (1947–2020), physicist
- Otto Struve (1897–1963), astronomer
- Boris Svistunov (born 1959), physicist, co-inventor of the widely used Worm Monte-Carlo algorithm
- Jacob Tamarkin (1888–1945), mathematician and vice-president of American Mathematical Society in 1942-43
- Leon Theremin (1896–1993), physicist, inventor of the Theremin
- Peter Turchin (born 1957), biologist and the father of cliodynamics
- Petr Ufimtsev (born 1931), Russian-American mathematician and physicist
- J. V. Uspensky (1883–1947), mathematician
- Arkady Vainshtein (born 1942), theoretical physicist
- Vladimir Vapnik (born 1936), developed the theory of the support vector machine also known as the "fundamental theory of learning" an important part of computational learning theory
- Leonid Vaseršteĭn (born 1944), mathematician known for providing a proof of Quillen–Suslin theorem
- Lev Vekker (1918–2001), psychologist
- Vladimir Voevodsky (1966–2017), the winner of the Fields Medal (2002)
- Alexander Vyssotsky (1888–1973), astronomer
- Paul Wiegmann (born 1952), physicist, pioneering contributions to the field of quantum integrable systems, including the exact solution of Kondo model
- Vladimir Yurkevich (1885–1964), naval architect
- Boris Zeldovich (1944–2018), physicist
- Efim Zelmanov (born 1955), winner of the Fields Medal (1994), professor at the University of California, San Diego
- George Zweig (born 1937), proposed the existence of quarks at CERN, independently of Murray Gell-Mann
- Vladimir Kosma Zworykin (1888–1982), one of the inventors of television

== Sports ==
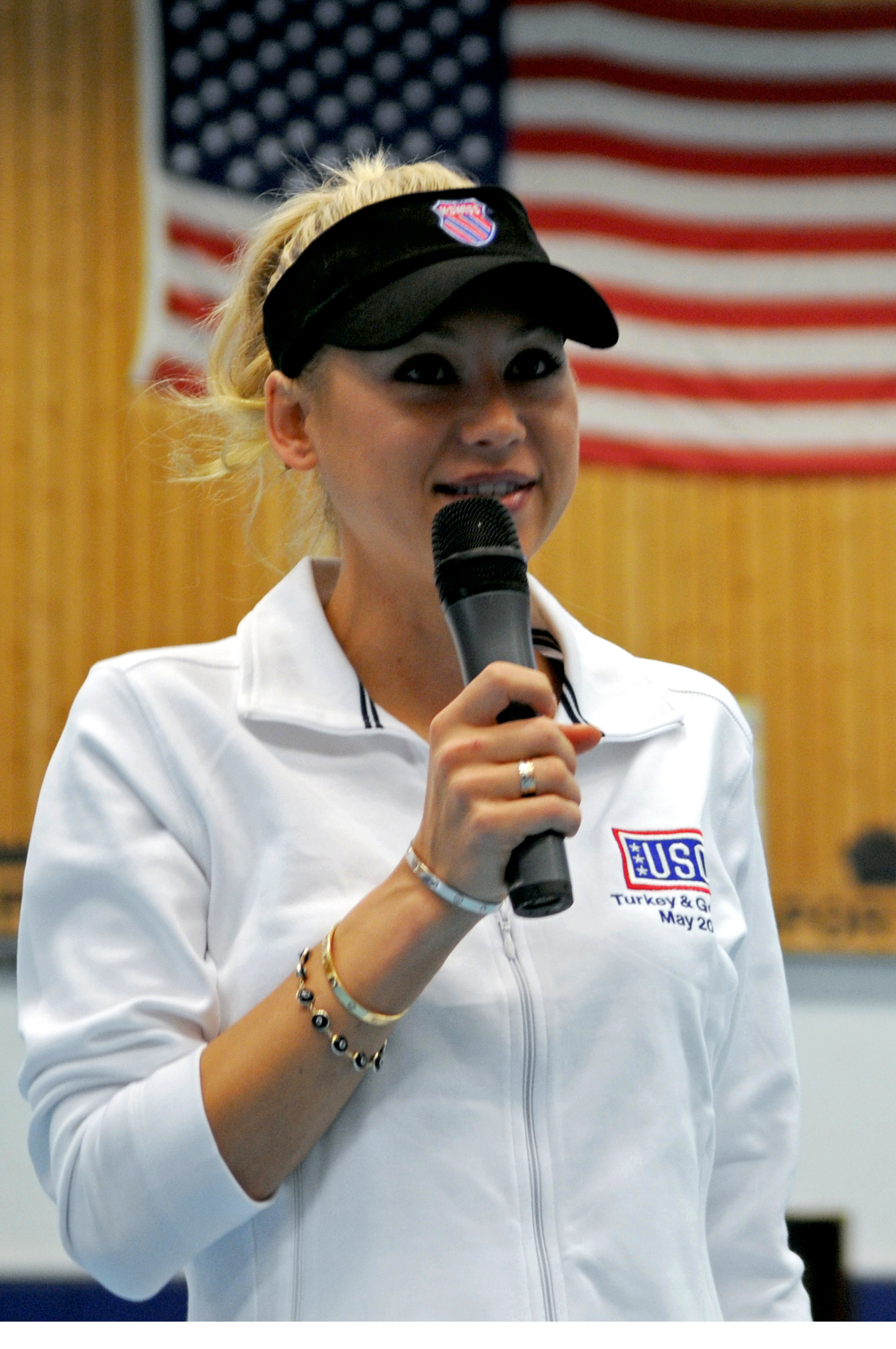
Anna Kournikova

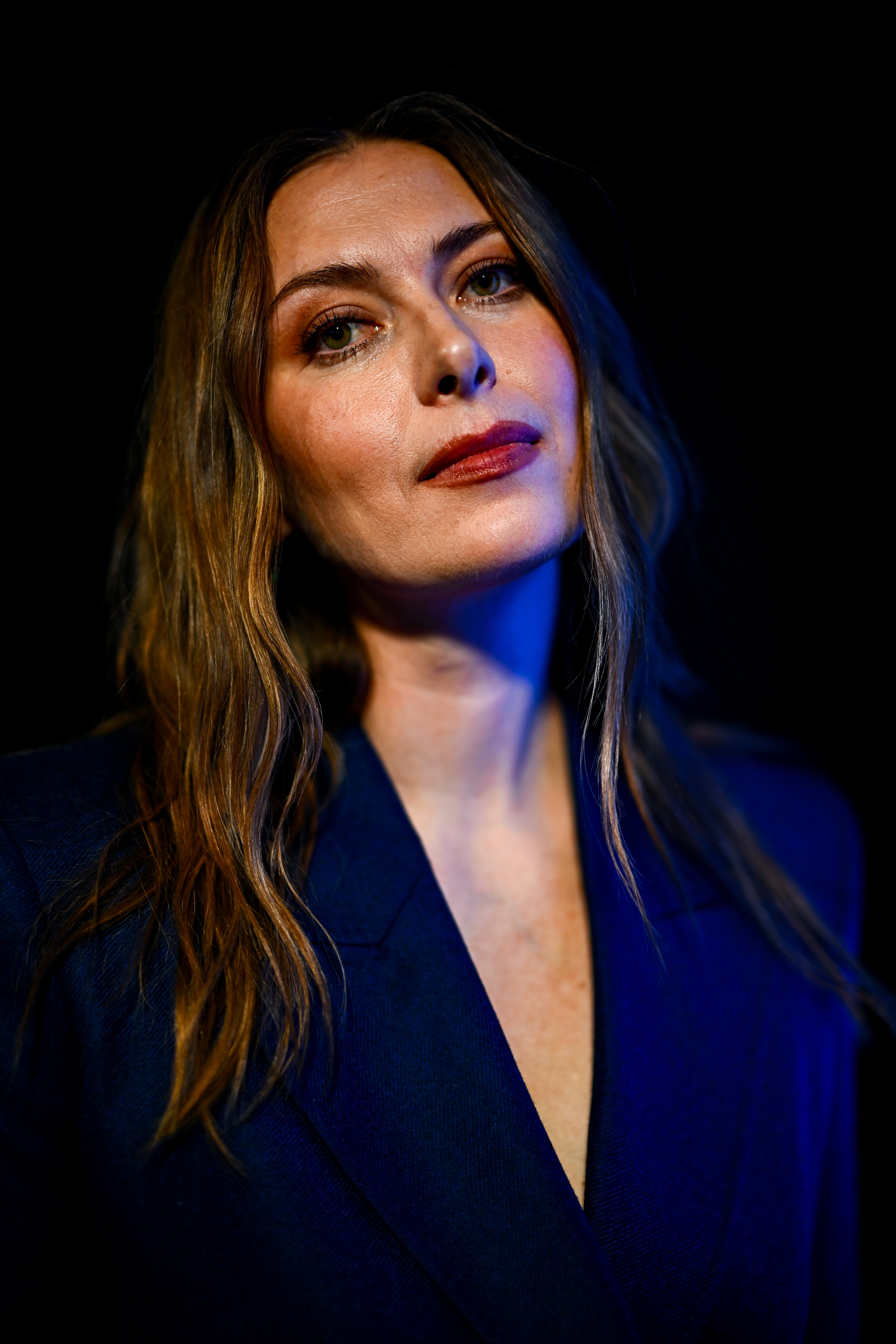
Maria Sharapova

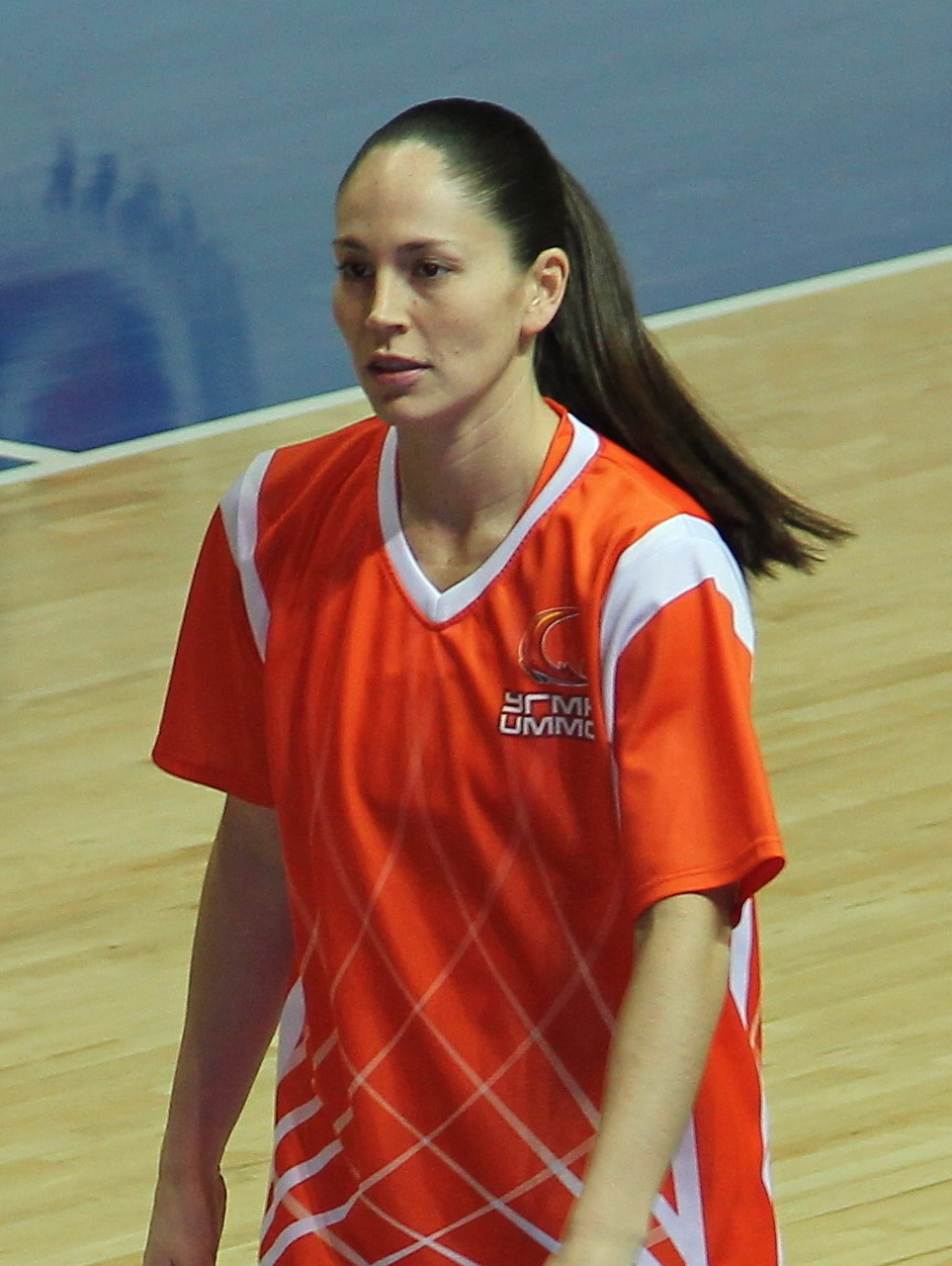
Sue Bird

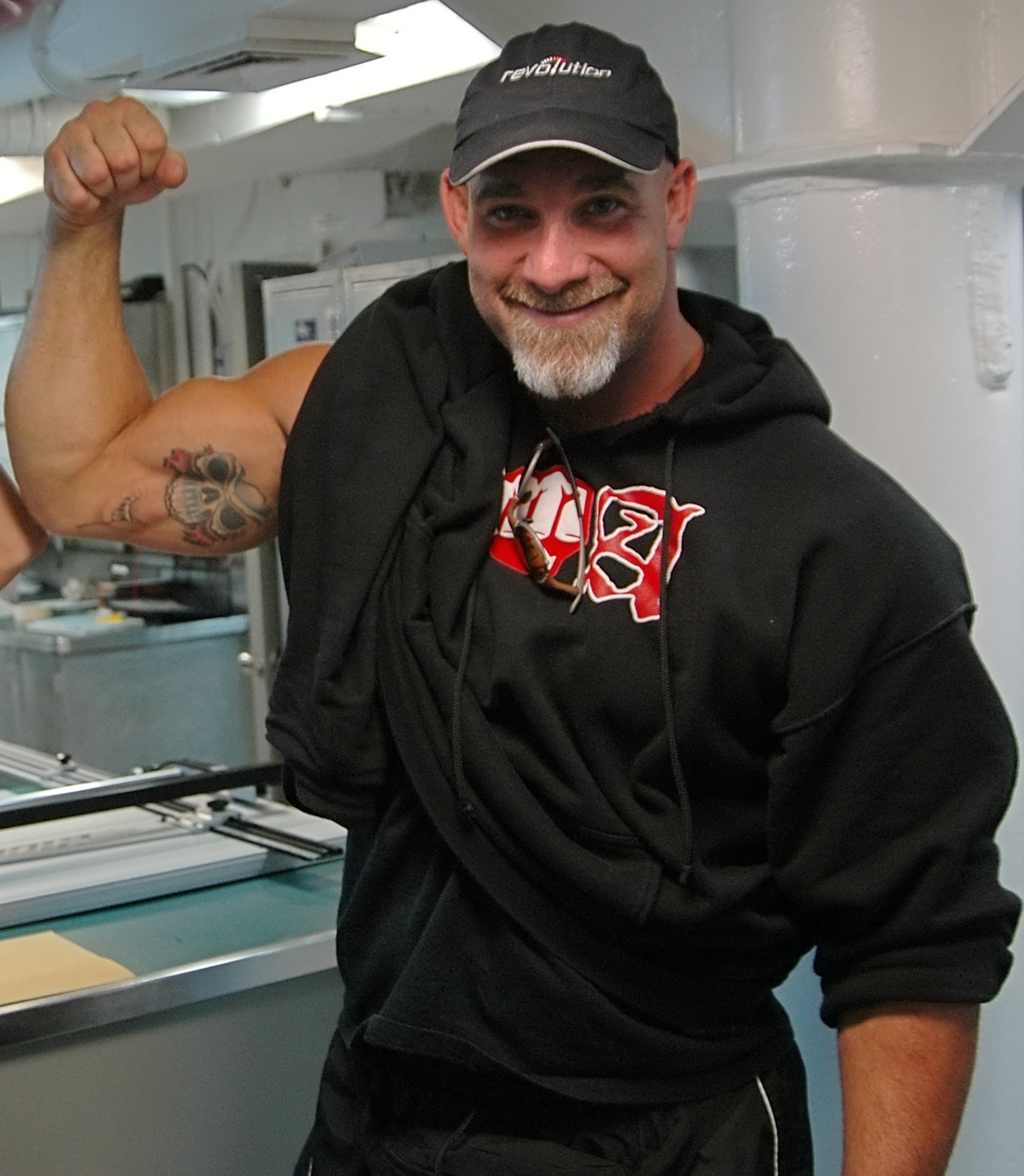
Bill Goldberg

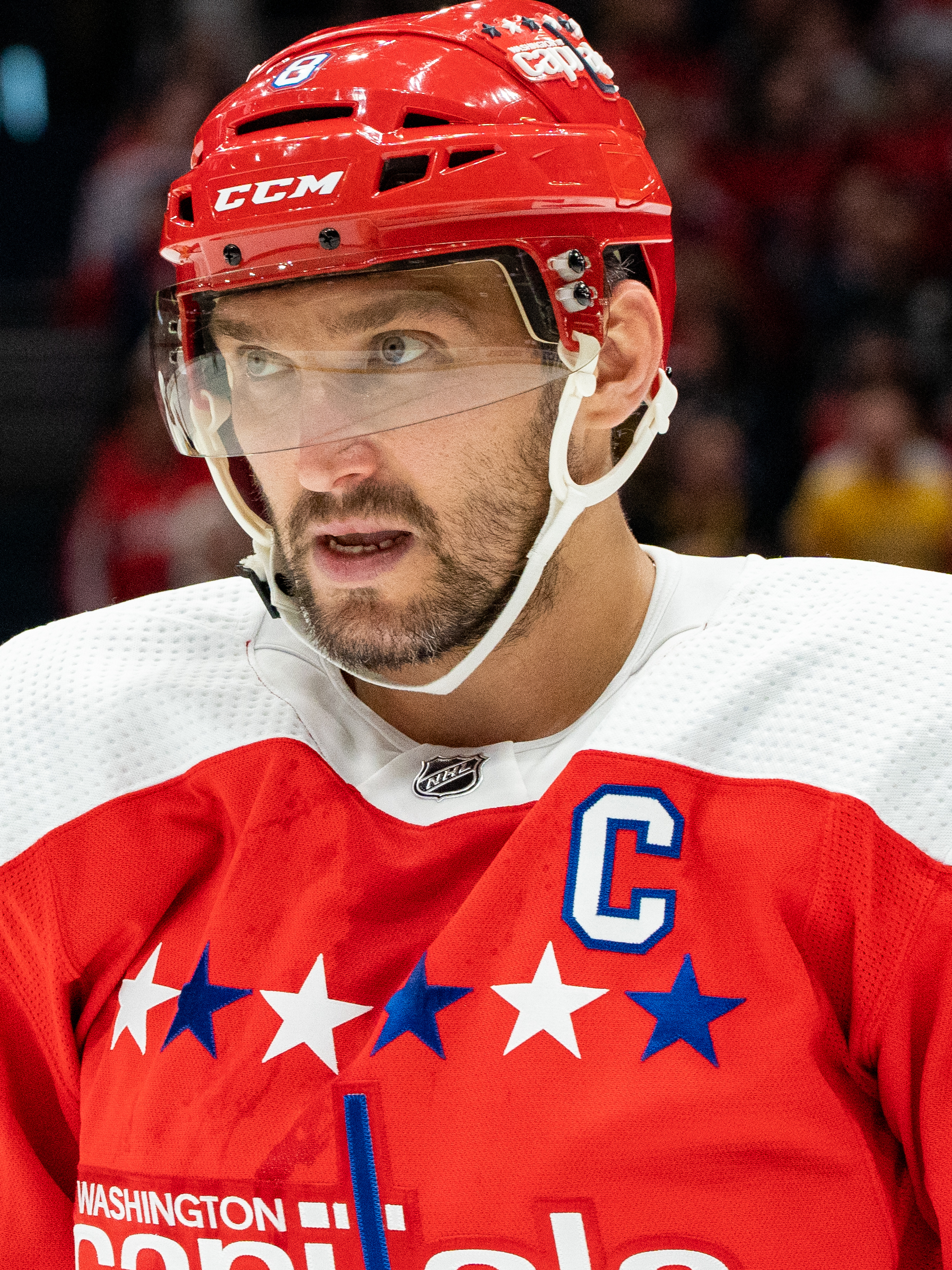
Alexander Ovechkin

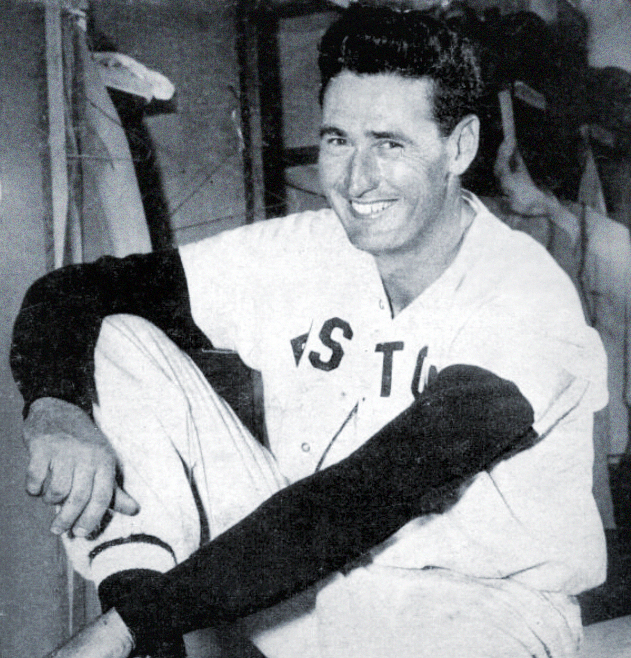
Ted Williams

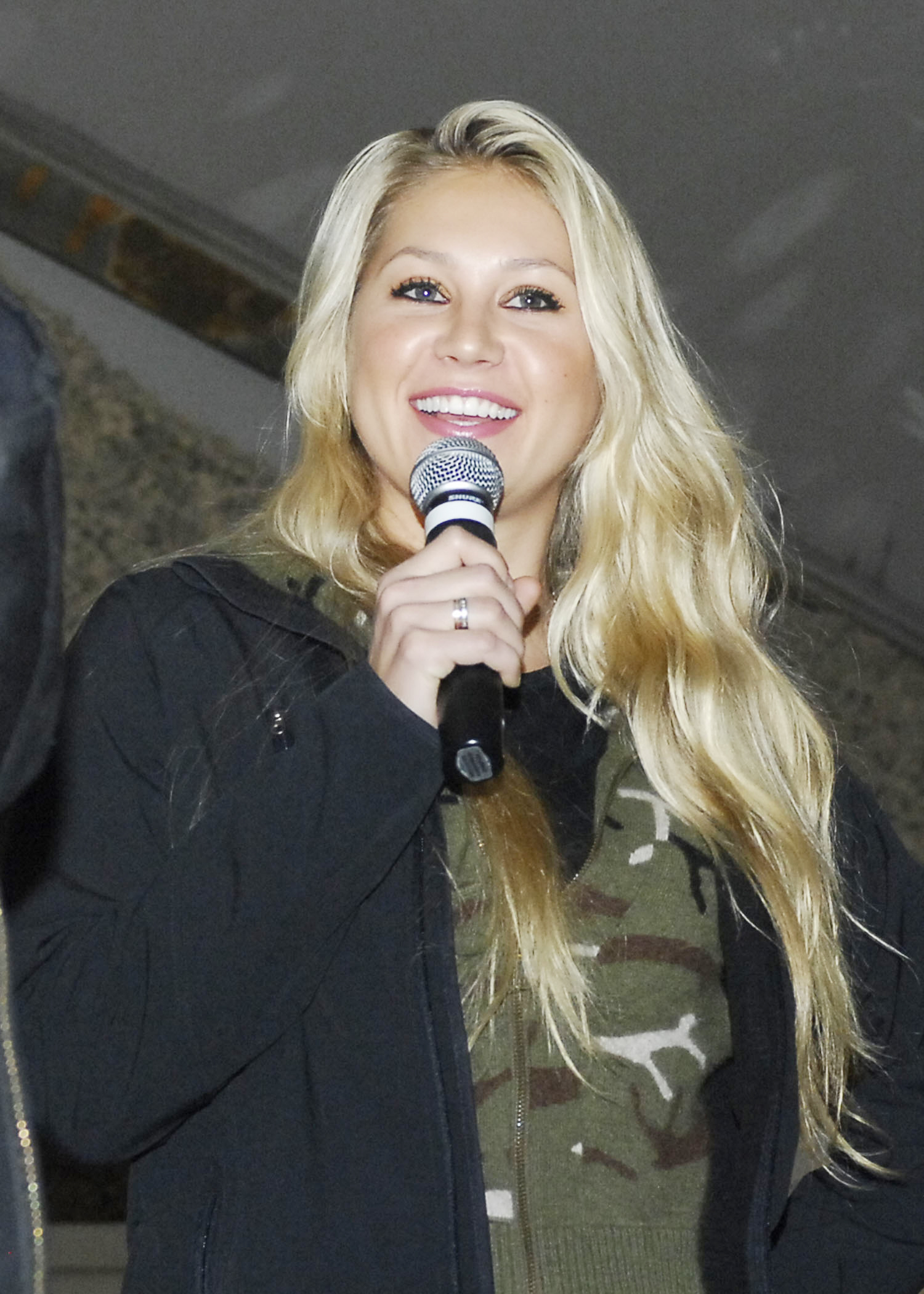
Anna Kournikova

- Benjamin Agosto (born 1982), ice dancer
- Doc Alexander (1897–1975), NFL football player and coach
- Lyle Alzado (1949–1992), NFL All Pro defensive tackle
- Amanda Anisimova (born 2001), tennis player
- Al Axelrod (1921–2004), Olympic fencer, bronze medalist
- Deborah Babashoff (born 1970), competition swimmer
- Jack Babashoff (born 1955), Olympic swimmer, silver medalist
- Shirley Babashoff (born 1957), Olympic swimmer, gold/silver medalist
- Bo Belinsky (1936–2001), baseball player
- Mohini Bhardwaj (born 1978), gymnast
- Fred Biletnikoff (born 1943), football wide receiver and coach
- Sue Bird (born 1980), professional women's basketball player
- Alex Bogomolov, Jr. (born 1983), professional tennis player
- Nathan Bor (1913–1972), boxer
- Alex Bregman (born 1994), baseball player
- Daniel Bukantz (1917–2008), four-time Olympic fencer
- Maxim Dlugy (born 1966), grandmaster of chess
- Brandon Dubinsky (born 1986), hockey player
- Rod Dyachenko (born 1983), footballer
- Curtis Enis (born 1976), football player
- Benny Friedman (1905–1982), NFL Hall of Fame football player
- Alex Galchenyuk (born 1994), hockey player
- Nastasya Generalova (born 2000), rhythmic gymnast, Russian mother
- Bill Goldberg (born 1966), professional NFL football player and undefeated wrestler
- Charles Goldenberg (1911–1986), All-Pro NFL player
- Alexander Goldin (born 1964), chess grandmaster
- Jon Robert Holden (born 1976), basketball player for Russian national team
- Nat Holman (1896–1995), Hall of Fame basketball player
- Red Holzman (1920–1998), NBA Hall of Fame basketball player and coach
- Irving Jaffee (1906–1981), Olympic speed skater; two gold medals
- Sofia Kenin (born 1998), tennis player
- Andrei Kirilenko (born 1981), basketball player
- Anna Kotchneva (born 1970), gymnast
- Anna Kournikova (born 1981), tennis player and model
- Vladimir Kozlov (born 1979), professional wrestler
- Travis Kvapil (born 1976), race car driver
- Varvara Lepchenko (born 1986), professional tennis player
- Nastia Liukin (born 1989), gymnast
- Valeri Liukin (born 1966), artistic gymnast
- Ilia Malinin (born 2004), U.S. Olympic figure skater, first skater to land a quad axel
- Cade McNown (born 1977), football player
- Frank Mir (born 1979), mixed martial artist
- Evgeni Nabokov (born 1975), San Jose Sharks' former Goalie
- Boris Nachamkin (born 1933), NBA basketball player
- Patrick O'Neal (born 1967), studio host and reporter
- Denis Petukhov (born 1978), figure skater
- Alexander Ovechkin (born 1985), hockey player
- Sergei Raad (born 1982), soccer player
- Jack Sack (1902–1980), American football player and coach
- Dmitry Salita (born 1982), boxer
- Ossie Schectman (1919–2013), basketball player who scored the first basket in National Basketball Association history
- Andy Seminick (1920–2004), professional baseball player
- Maria Sharapova (born 1987), tennis player
- Allie Sherman (1923–2015), National Football League player and head coach
- Mose Solomon (1900–1966), the "Rabbi of Swat," Major League Baseball player
- Kerri Strug (born 1977), gymnast
- Peter Tchernyshev (born 1971), ice-dancer
- Phil Weintraub (1907–1987), Major League Baseball first baseman and outfielder
- Ted Williams (1918–2002), Major League Baseball left fielder
- Anna Zatonskih, chess player

== Military ==
- Boris Pash (1900–1995), Colonel of the US Army
- Gary Tabach (born 1962), retired United States Navy captain, the first Soviet-born citizen to be commissioned an officer in the Armed Forces of the United States
- John Basil Turchin (1822–1901), Union army general in the American Civil War

== Business ==
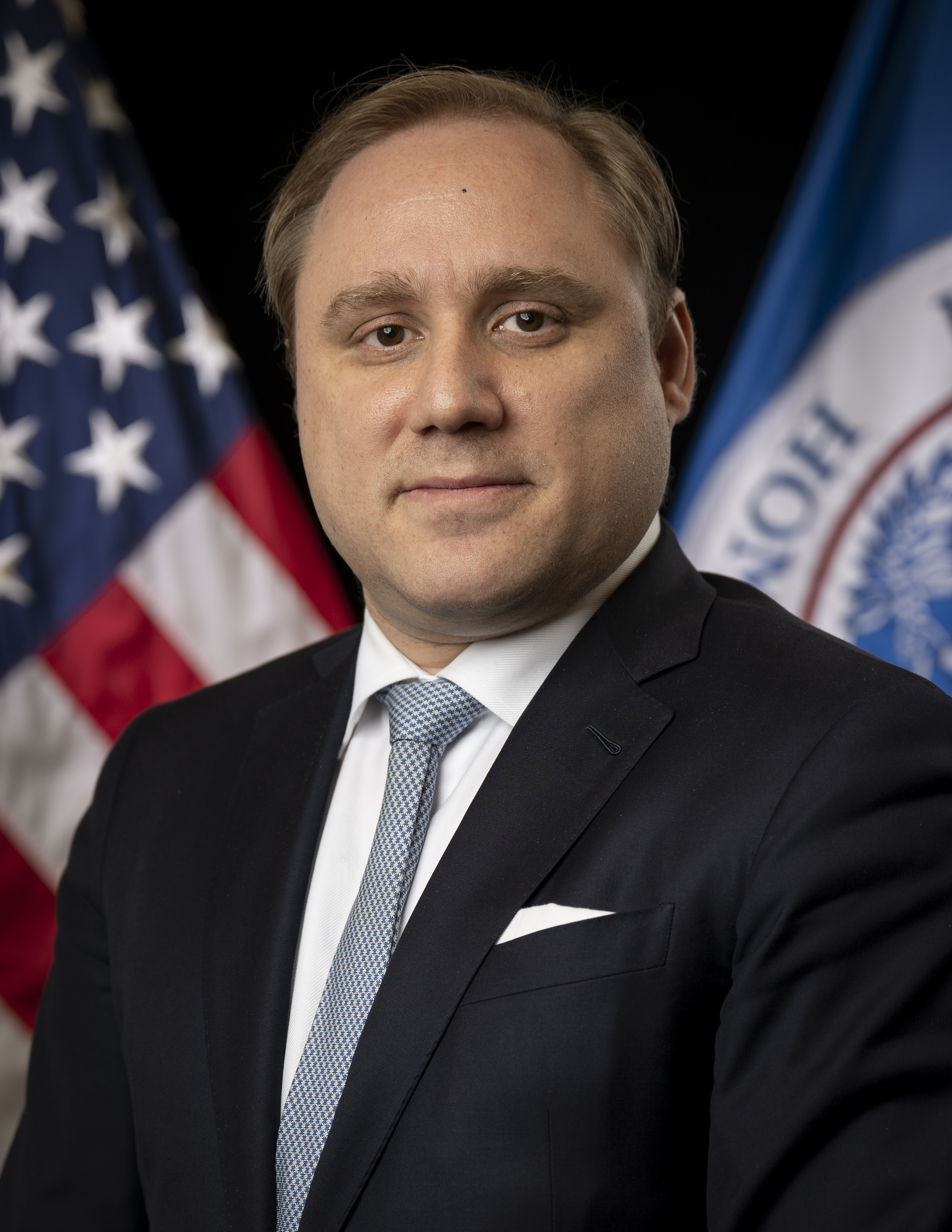
Dmitri Alperovitch

- Dmitri Alperovitch (born 1980)
- Marc Benioff (born 1964), founder of Salesforce
- Sergey Brin (born 1973), co-founder of Google, Russian-Jewish immigrant
- Boris Chaikovsky (1925–1996), founder of Tele-King International
- Donna Dubinsky (born 1955), co-founder of Palm, Inc.
- Valentin Gapontsev (1939–2021), fiber laser technology pioneer, founder of IPG Photonics
- Alexander Poniatoff (1892–1980), founder of Ampex Corporation
- Abram Nicholas Pritzker, real estate investor and member of the Pritzker family
- Alexander P. de Seversky (1894–1974), founder of the Seversky Aircraft Corporation, founder and trustee of the New York Institute of Technology
- Igor Sikorsky (1889–1972), aviation pioneer in both helicopters and fixed-wing aircraft, founder of the Sikorsky Aircraft Corporation, a leading US helicopter manufacturer
- Serge Sorokko (born 1954), art dealer, publisher and patron
- Michael Stroukoff (1883–1973), President of the Chase Aircraft Company, founder of the Stroukoff Aircraft Corporation
- André Tchelistcheff (1901–1994), America's most influential post-Prohibition winemaker
- Ratmir Timashev (born 1966), founder and CEO of Veeam Software

== Politics ==
- Bella Abzug (1920–1998), former Representative from New York (Both of her parents were Russian Jewish immigrants)
- Alec Brook-Krasny (born 1958), first Soviet-born Russian speaker to become a member of the New York State Assembly
- Ben Cardin (born 1943), politician of Russian Jewish descent
- William Cohen (born 1940), father of Russian Jewish descent
- John M. Deutch (born 1938), former Director of Central Intelligence, U.S. Deputy Secretary of Defense, and Under Secretary of Defense for Acquisition and Technology
- Russ Feingold (born 1953), partial Russian Jewish descent
- Al Franken (born 1951), maternal grandmother of Russian Jewish descent
- Gary Johnson (born 1953), mother of partial Russian descent
- Jon Ossoff (born 1987), father of partial Russian Jewish descent
- Bernie Sanders (born 1941), mother of partial Russian descent
- Scott Stringer (born 1960), New York City Comptroller and Borough President of Manhattan, of part Russian Jewish descent
- David Storobin (born 1979), former New York State Senator (born in the Soviet Union to Russian Jewish parents)
- Jim Talent (born 1956), former U.S. Senator, paternal grandparents were Jewish immigrants from Russia

== Economics ==
- Simon Kuznets (1901–1985), contribution to the transformation of economics into an empirical science and to the formation of quantitative economic history
- Wassily Leontief (1905–1999), economist, Nobel Prize 1973
- Hyman Minsky (1919–1996), economist, renowned for his research on financial crisis; born to a Belarusian Jewish Menshevik immigrant family

== Modeling ==
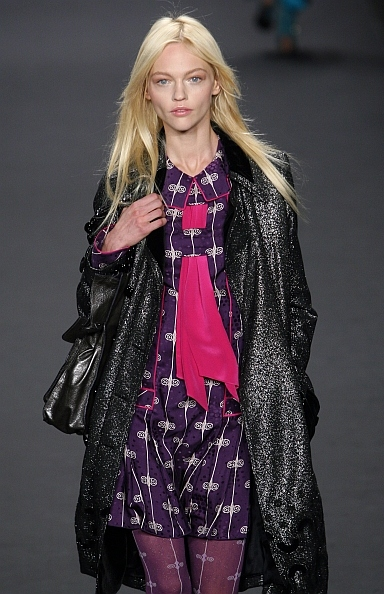
Sasha Pivovarova

- Angelika Kallio (born 1972), model born in Riga
- Tatiana Kovylina (born 1981), model born in Kazan
- Josie Maran (born 1978), model of Russian descent
- Michele Merkin (born 1975), model and television host, also of Swedish and Russian Jewish descent
- Anya Monzikova (born 1984), model and actress born in Vologda
- Irina Pantaeva (born 1972), model and actress born in Ulan-Ude
- Irina Shayk (born 1986), model and actress of Russian and Tatar descent, born in Yemanzhelinsk
- Kristina Pimenova (born 2005), child model and actress
- Sasha Pivovarova (born 1985), model born in Moscow
- Natasha Poly (born 1985), model born in Perm
- Vlada Roslyakova (born 1987), model born in Omsk
- Tatiana Sorokko (born 1971), model and fashion writer born in Arzamas-16
- Daria Strokous (born 1990), model born in Moscow
- Eugenia Volodina (born 1984), model born in Kazan
- Anne Vyalitsyna (born 1986), model and actress

== Other ==
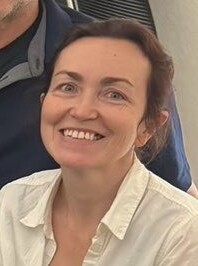
Alsu Kurmasheva

- Svetlana Alliluyeva (1926–2011), daughter of Joseph Stalin
- Ksenia Karelina (born 1991), ballet dancer; Russian immigrant
- Leo Portnoff (1875 – 1940), musician, teacher, and composer
- David I. Arkin (1906–1980), teacher, painter, writer, lyricist, parents were Russian immigrants
- Benny Benson (1913–1972), designer of flag of Alaska
- Antuan Bronshtein (1972–1973), convicted murderer; Russian immigrant
- Jacob W. Davis (1831–1908), tailor, invention of Jeans
- Peter Demens (1850–1919), one of the founders of the U.S. city of Saint Petersburg, Florida
- Max Factor Sr. (1877–1938), founder of the cosmetics giant Max Factor & Company, born in Russian Poland; Russian nobility appointed Factor the official cosmetics expert for the royal family and the Imperial Russian Grand Opera
- Betty Freeman (1921–2009), art philanthropist, father was a Russian immigrant
- Masha Gessen (born 1967), journalist, author, translator and activist; Russian Jewish immigrant
- Alsu Kurmasheva (born 1976), journalist; Russian Tatar immigrant
- Bianna Golodryga (born 1978), journalist; Russian Jewish immigrant (born in Moldovan SSR)
- John A. Gotti (born 1964), leader of the Gambino crime family of the Cosa Nostra; mother of Russian descent
- Oleg Kalugin (born 1934), former head of KGB operations in the United States
- Taras Kulakov (born 1987), YouTube personality known for life hack and gadget reviewing videos, of Ukrainian descent
- Loren Leman (born 1950), former lieutenant governor of Alaska, one of his ancestors was a Russian settler who married an indigenous Alutiiq woman in Kodiak while Russia claimed and colonized Alaska centuries ago
- Doctor Mike, real name Mikhail Varshavski (born 1989), Russian-born internet personality and family medicine physician, moved to the U.S. with his family at age six
- Janosh Jovan Neumann (born 1979), former "K" department SEB FSB (Russian: Службы экономической безопасности ФСБ) agent who was associated with "shadow finance" and defected to USA in 2008; birth name is Alexy Yurievich Artamonov (Russian: Алексей Юрьевич Артамонов)
- Boris Perchatkin (born 1 July 1946), the most famous participant in Nakhodka's religious emigration movement of the late 1970s and early 1980s, a human rights activist who lobbied in the United States for the adoption of the "Lautenberg's Amendment" in 1989, as a result of which about 1 million people emigrated to the United States from the countries of the former USSR
- Neil Sedaka (born 1939), singer-songwriter
- Pitirim Sorokin (1889–1968), founded Harvard Sociology Department in 1930
- Vitaly Zdorovetskiy (born 1992), Russian Jewish YouTube personality known for his adult rated pranks, was born in Murmansk
- Virsaviya Borum-Goncharova (born 2009) Russian born-American artist born with Pentalogy of Cantrell
- Lana Lokteff (born 1979), YouTuber
