= Tonearm (disambiguation) =

A tonearm is a movable arm supporting the pickup of a phonograph.

Tonearm may also refer to:

- Tonearm (musician), the stage name of Russian-American electronic musician Ilia Bis
- Magnetic cartridge, an electromechanical transducer that the tonearm is coupled to
