= Ksenia Karelina =

Russian-American ballet dancer imprisoned for treason

- Ксения Карелина
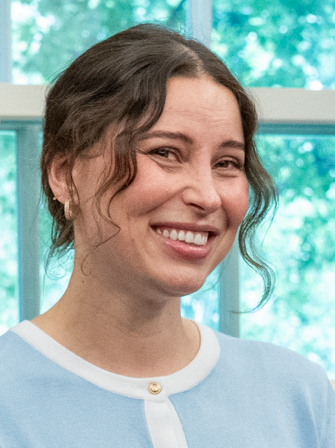
- Karelina in 2025
- Born: December 13, 1991 (age 34); Yekaterinburg, Russian SFSR
- Citizenship: Russia; United States
- Education: Ural Federal University
- Occupation: Ballet dancer
- Criminal charges: Treason
- Criminal penalty: 12 years imprisonment
- Criminal status: Released in an exchange deal

Ksenia Karelina (also Ksenia Khavana; born December 13, 1991) is a Russian-American ballet dancer and spa employee who was imprisoned for treason by the Russian government. The FSB accused Karelina of taking part in "public actions to support the Kyiv regime" for donating $51.80 to a charity supporting Ukraine. She was originally facing life in prison as a result, but was instead sentenced to 12 years. She was released on April 10, 2025, as part of a prisoner exchange, and made an appearance with President Donald Trump at the White House on May 5, 2025.

== Early life ==
Karelina was born in Yekaterinburg, Russia. Karelina emigrated to the United States in 2012 and became a citizen in 2021. She resided in Los Angeles.

== Arrest and conviction ==
Karelina was arrested in early 2024 while visiting her family in Yekaterinburg and charged with treason by the Russian government for sending $51.80 to Razom, a New York City-based nonprofit organization that sends humanitarian assistance to Ukraine. She made a single transfer on the first day of the Russian invasion of Ukraine on February 24, 2022. Razom denied claims by Russia's FSB that it collects money for weapons and ammunition. Her boyfriend Chris Van Heerden said he does not understand how Russian authorities knew about her donation, adding that Karelina believed she was in no danger before traveling to Russia.

Her trial began on June 20, 2024 and she admitted guilt on August 7. On August 15, 2024, she was sentenced by the regional courts of Sverdlovsk and Yekaterinburg to 12 years in prison. Karelina was sentenced by Judge Andrei Mineev, the same judge who previously sentenced Wall Street Journal reporter Evan Gershkovich. On April 10, 2025, she was released in a prisoner swap in Abu Dhabi between Russia and the United States with mediation from the United Arab Emirates in exchange for a German-Russian prisoner named Arthur Petrov.

== See also ==
- Human rights in Russia
- List of Russian Americans
- List of American people imprisoned in Russia
