= Misha Frid =

Russian sculptor

- Born: November 22, 1938 (age 87); Moscow, USSR
- Occupations: Artist, sculptor, filmmaker
- Years active: 1962–present
- Spouse: Galina Fridman (m. 1967)
- Children: 3
- Website: MishaFrid.com

Misha Frid (born November 22, 1938) is a Russian-born American sculptor, artist, graphic designer, and filmmaker who lives in the San Francisco Bay Area. Frid immigrated to the US in 1972 with his wife, Galina, and their two sons. His works are housed in private and corporate collections and galleries and museums around the world.

== Early life and education ==
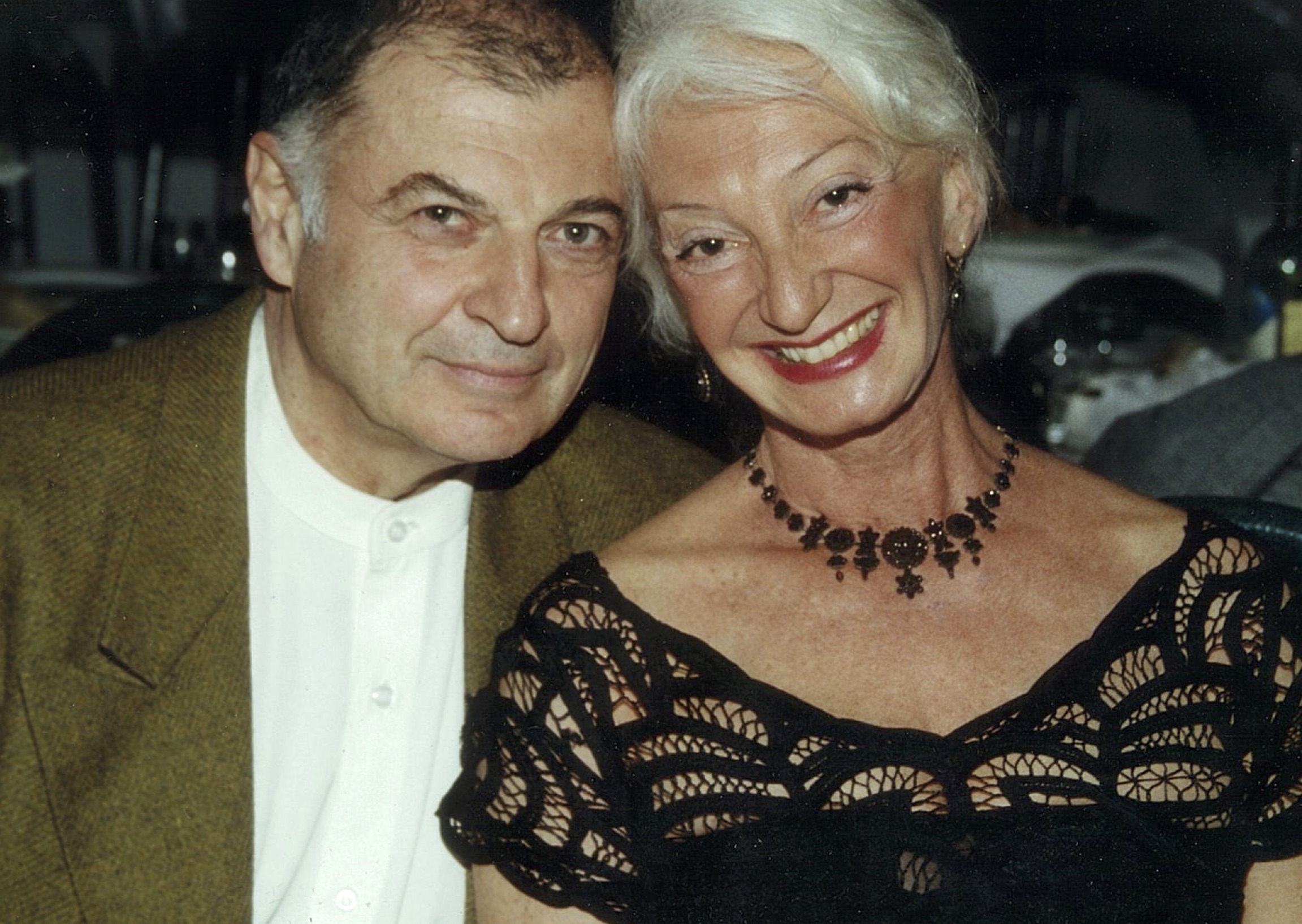
Frid and his wife, Galina, in 2012

Frid was born in 1938 to a Jewish family in Moscow. His father was from Lithuania, and his mother was from Belarus. When he was five, his father took him to a music school to study the violin; his father dreamed of seeing him become a concert violinist, but Misha's dream was to become a sculptor. Five years later, he switched from his music school to art school to study graphic arts and sculpture; however, music has remained an important part of his life. Frid graduated from high school in 1955 with honors. He also graduated with honors from Moscow State Art College in 1967 and the University of Fine Arts in the city, and studied film directing at the Russian State University of Cinematography in Moscow in 1972. In 1964, he had an exhibition at the Pushkin Museum in Moscow with other young artists. Russian culture and literature influence Frid's artistry. A love for Russian composers and Russian ballet inspired him, and he sees ballet as sculpture in motion.

A hot summer in 1972 resulted in crop failure and famine, and led to an appeal from Russia for help from the UN; however, the Iron Curtain prevented wheat imports from the US. The US agreed to help the USSR in exchange for 150 refuseniks to be allowed out of the Soviet Union, and Leonid Brezhnev agreed. At the time Frid was a member of the Sculptor Society of Russia, and his work was on exhibit in museums. The "Jackson Amendment" (as it was called in Russia) benefited Frid's family, and he received a letter permitting him to leave Russia within 14 days with $80 per person. Frid, his wife and two sons (11 months and five years) emigrated to the United States.

== Career ==
The purpose of my work is to show people the beauty of life, not the ugliness.

— Misha Frid

In 1978, Frid became a US citizen. He developed a working relationship with the artist and designer Erté, who was 80 years old: "I felt like a young writer, having the incredible fortune to know Shakespeare". Wentworth Publishing Corporation represented Frid from 1990 to 2011, selling over 5,000 of his sculptures. In 1984, he and his family moved to Toronto. Frid has exhibited his art at New York's International ArtExpo. He exhibited his art at the International ArtExpo in Los Angeles in 1989 and 1990, and at the Tokyo International Art Show in 1990, 1991, 1993 and 1994.
Frid won a 1991 Toronto public-art competition with The Lady of the Lily, a 10-foot bronze sculpture. As part of SIART’93, a 1993 cultural-exchange program, he exhibited his art in Seoul. Frid was chosen as a sculptor by the United States Olympic Committee, and created Equestrian, Gymnast and Stadium Jumper for the centennial 1996 Summer Olympics in Atlanta. He presented his sculpture for the first time in a collection of drawings at the 2000 International ArtExpo in New York. Frid exhibited his work at the 2003 and 2004 Toronto ArtExpos.

In 2006, he and his family returned to the US. Two years later, the American Sport Art Museum and Archives in Alabama added Equestrian, Gymnast and Stadium Jumper to its permanent collection. Frid also contributed ikebana to the Exquisite Harmony East West exhibition, which featured Western sculpture and traditional Japanese ikebana flower arrangements uniting Eastern and Western culture, at the Art People Gallery in San Francisco that year. He received a certificate of recognition from Japanese consul general Yasumasa Nagamine and a commendation from California Assemblyman Mark Leno. In 2008, Frid's The Centaur was found among thousands of stolen bicycles and quantities of marijuana and cocaine.

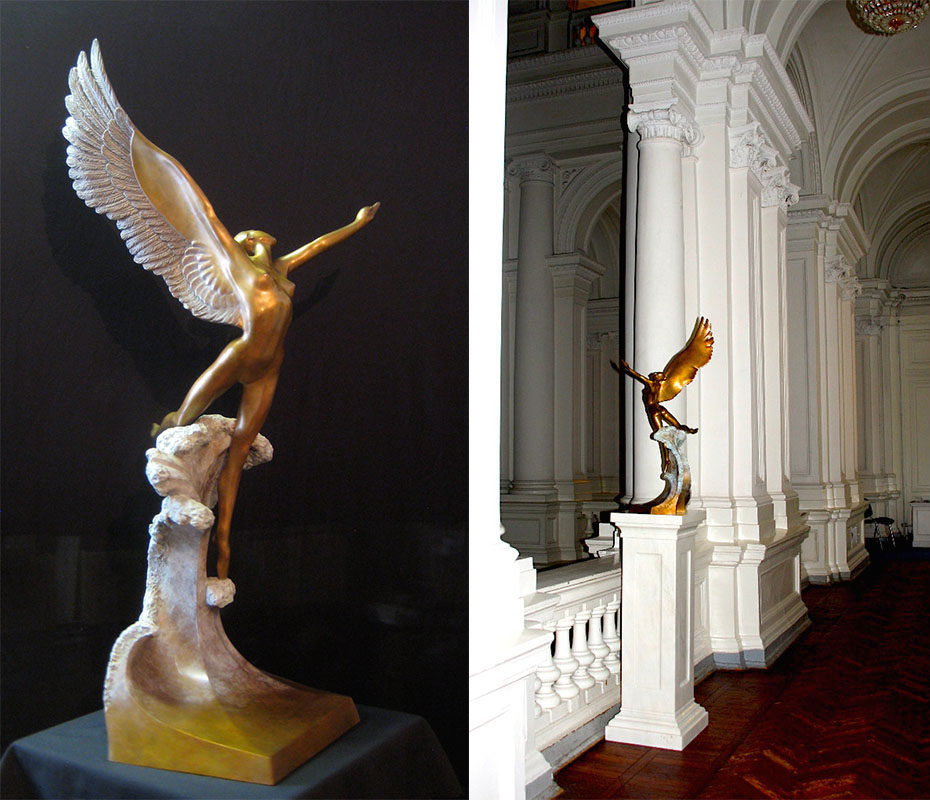
Swan Lake in bronze at the Saint Petersburg Conservatory in Russia, 2014

Frid created the Freedom of Expression Award for the best director at the Jewish Film Festival in San Francisco, symbolizing "the never extinguished flame of Jewish daring and creativity, from 2008 to 2012." Among the directors to receive the bronze award was 95-year-old Kirk Douglas, before the screening of Spartacus in 2011.
Frid donated his Swan Lake to the Saint Petersburg Conservatory for its 150th anniversary.
He and Wayne Schotten produced the 2013 documentary film, Swan Lake in Bronze, which received the Best Cinematography for Documentary award at the 2014 Downtown Film Festival Los Angeles. Frid created two bronze sculptures for the 20th anniversary of the Vladimir Spivakov International Charity Foundation in Moscow in 2014. The following year, Spivakov awarded Frid's Mercy to actor Yevgeny Mironov.

== Philanthropy ==
Frid has donated his sculptures and drawings to Okizu, the San Francisco Symphony, the Art Deco Society of Los Angeles, and the American-Russian Cultural Cooperation Foundation.

== Gallery ==
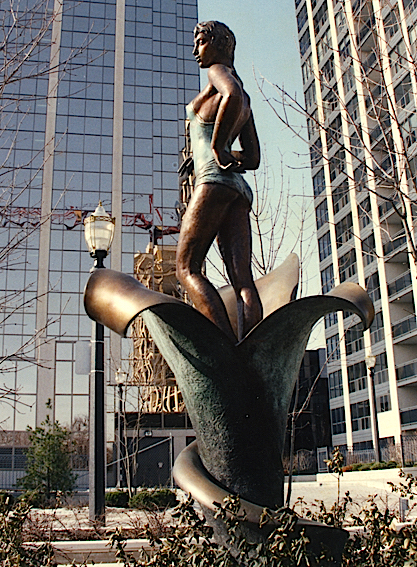
Lady of the Lily (1991)

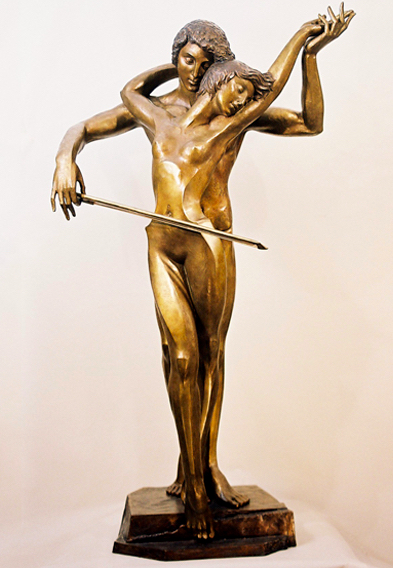
Duet

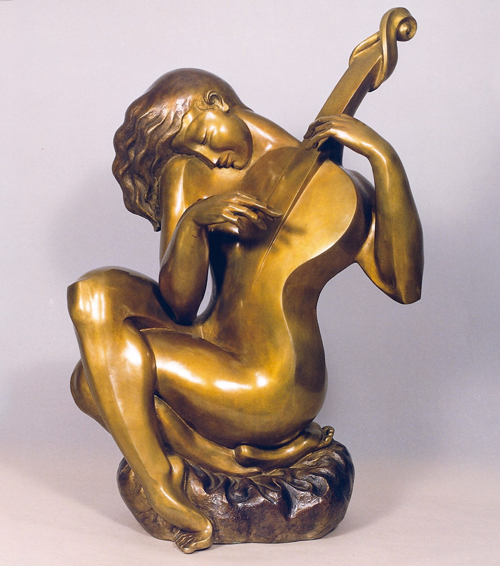
Guitar

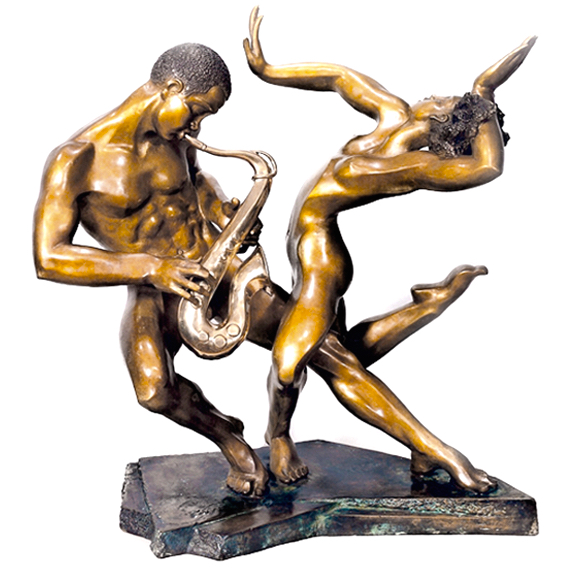
Jazz

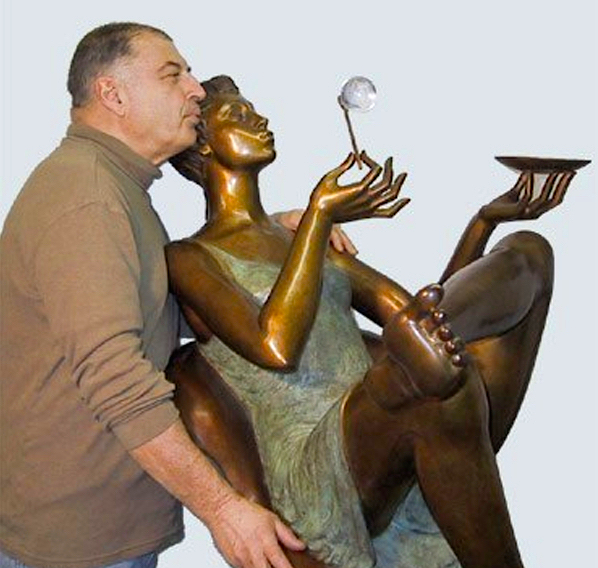
Sheer Delight

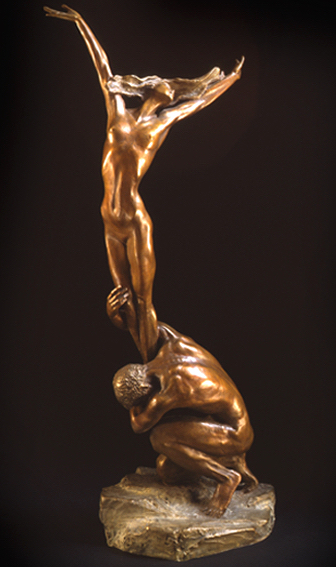
Earth and Sky

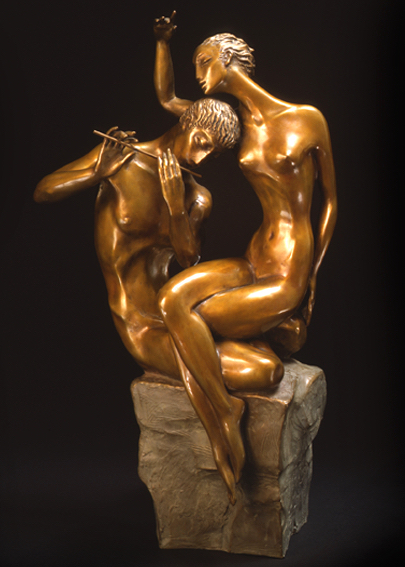
Magic Flute

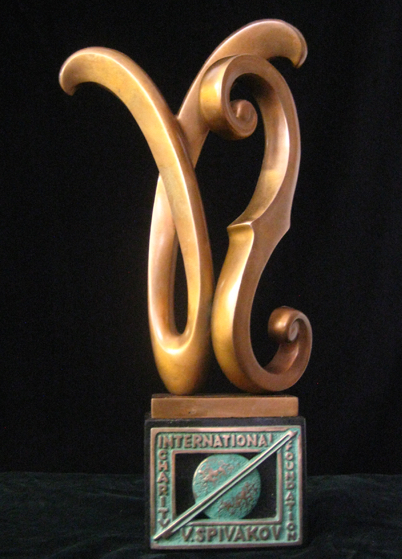
Spivakov Charity Foundation award

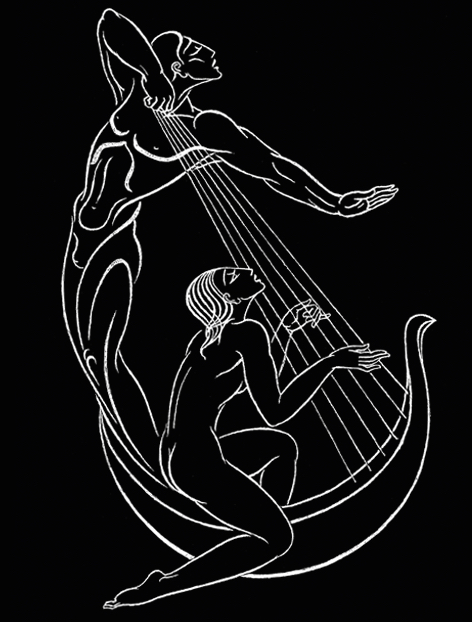
Harp

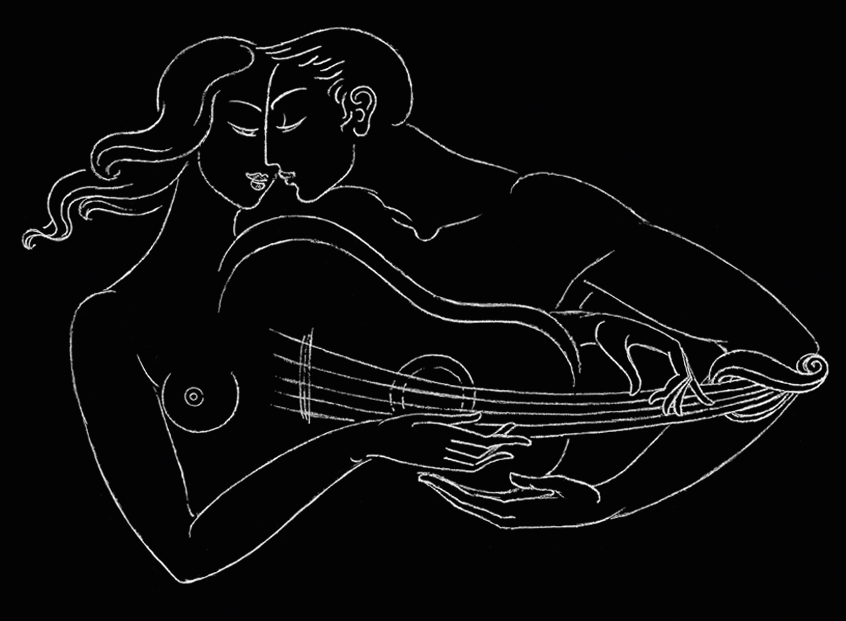
Serenade

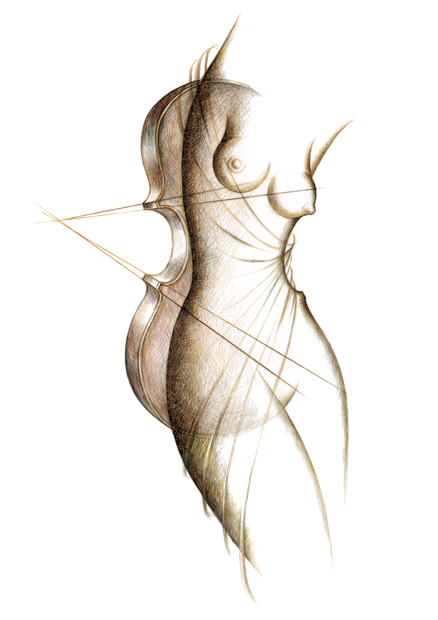
Violin Torso

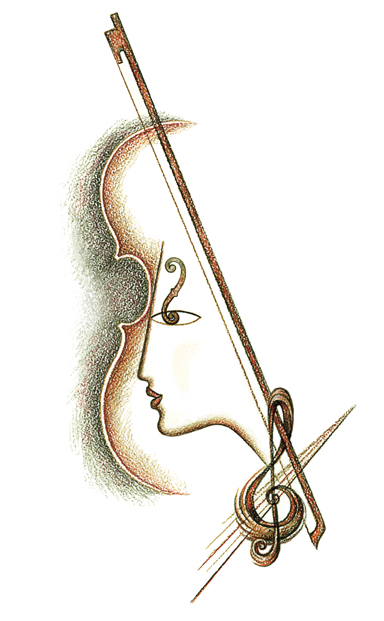
Music Profile

== Sources ==
- Misha Frid, "6th Exhibition of Young Moscow Artists", Moscow, USSR (Russia), p. 64, 1961
- Catalog "Exhibition of Moscow Region Artists", USSR (Russia), p. 26, 1961
- Photos of Misha Frid's art, USSR Journal Soviet Woman ("Советская Женщина") No.6, p. 2, 1963
- Article "Steps to the World of Art" ("Ступеньки в Мир искусства"), USSR (Russian) Newspaper Evening Moscow ("Вечерняя Москва"), p. 2, Apr., 12, 1966
- Two full pages "Mein Kindergarten" about Misha Frid's art, German Magazine Freie Welt, p. 36, Dec., 01, 1966
- Full page about Misha Frid, Polish Magazine Kraj Rad, p. 29, Dec., 04, 1966
- Article about a group of artists in newspaper "Russian Jews speak freely at Westside Center" by Betty Nutkiewicz, The JCA News, Jewish Centers Association of Los Angeles, p. 13, Winter, 1975
- Article about Misha Frid's collection, "The passion reined", SunStorm Arts Magazine, p. 4, Apr., 1987
- Article "Exhibition "ArtExpo-87" by Lana Mack, Russian Newspaper Novoye Russkoye Slovo, 1987
- The Toronto Star Newspaper, p. G3, Nov., 19, 1988, article about Misha Frid "Emigre artist says the future lies in the past" by Christopher Hume.
- The Canadian Jewish News, p. 52, Sep., 13, 1990 Article "Soviet sculptor Misha Frid pursues artistic dreams" by Frances Kraft
- Full page about Misha Frid. Article "One of the most prominent sculptors in the world", photo "The Violin Player", Wentworth Publishing, Magazine Art Business News, p. 55, May, 1992
- Full page "Misha Frid sculptor of dream", Russian Newspaper Vestnik ("Вестник"), Canada, p. 10, Jun., 25,1992
- Article about "Exhibition of sculpture Misha Frid in Toronto", Russian Magazine in Canada, Info Toronto ("Инфо Торонто"), p. 7, Jan., 25, 1993
- The Canadian Jewish News, p. 41, Jan., 20, 1994 Article "Frid does well in the Orient" by Miriam Chinsky
- The Tribune Magazine, p. 14, Apr., 11, 1996 Article "Toronto Sculptor Enjoys World Fame" by Jack Kohane
- Exodus ("Эксодус") Russian Newspaper in Canada, p. 12, May, 1996 "Art brings pleasure to the eyes" ("Очей Очарованье") by Anatoly Kachkin. Full page about art and life of the artist Misha Frid.
- Article about singer Rod Stewart and Misha Frid's exhibition in Elaine Tennyson Gallery, Toronto, Canada. He was honorable guest. Rod Stewart invited Misha Frid and his wife to his performance in Toronto. The Toronto Star, p. D2, Mar. 26, 1999
- The Globe and Mail Magazine, p. C4, Mar., 26, 1999 Article "Rocker Rod Stewart gets a bit cranky on the rebound" by Alexandra Gill, Story about Rod Stewart visiting one man show by Misha Frid in Elaine Tennyson Gallery in Toronto.
- Article about introduction a new sculpture "Jazz" from the series "The world of musical art", Art Business News Magazine, p. 161, Mar., 1999
- Article about new sculptures "Muze" and "Cello Player", West-East Toronto (Запад-Восток), Russian Magazine, Canada, p. 15, Mar., 16, 2004
- Beth Emeth Bais Yehuda Synagogue Book, May 12, 2004, Article about commission "Yakir Hakahal" award made in crystal by Misha Frid for Beth Emeth Bais Yehuda synagogue.
- One man show in Los Angeles, Art-DECO – Glamour in Harmony, Groundfloor Gallery, DTLA, Bunkerhillmagazine.com, Jul., 2011
