= Gennady Potapenko =

American radio astronomer

Gennady Vasilyevich Potapenko (Russian: Геннадий Васильевич Потапенко) (Mar 25, 1894 – June, 1979) was an American radio astronomer of Russian origin.

After the signal discoveries made by Karl Jansky in the mid-1930s, Potapenko (then a Cambridge physicist), along with Caltech physicist Donald Folland and Palomar telescope designer Russell Porter, attempted further researches in 'star static' in 1936. They were able to confirm Jansky's results with a loop antenna, then a single wire, but were unable to secure adequate funding to continue.

== See also ==
- Grote Reber
