= Victor Galitski =

American physicist

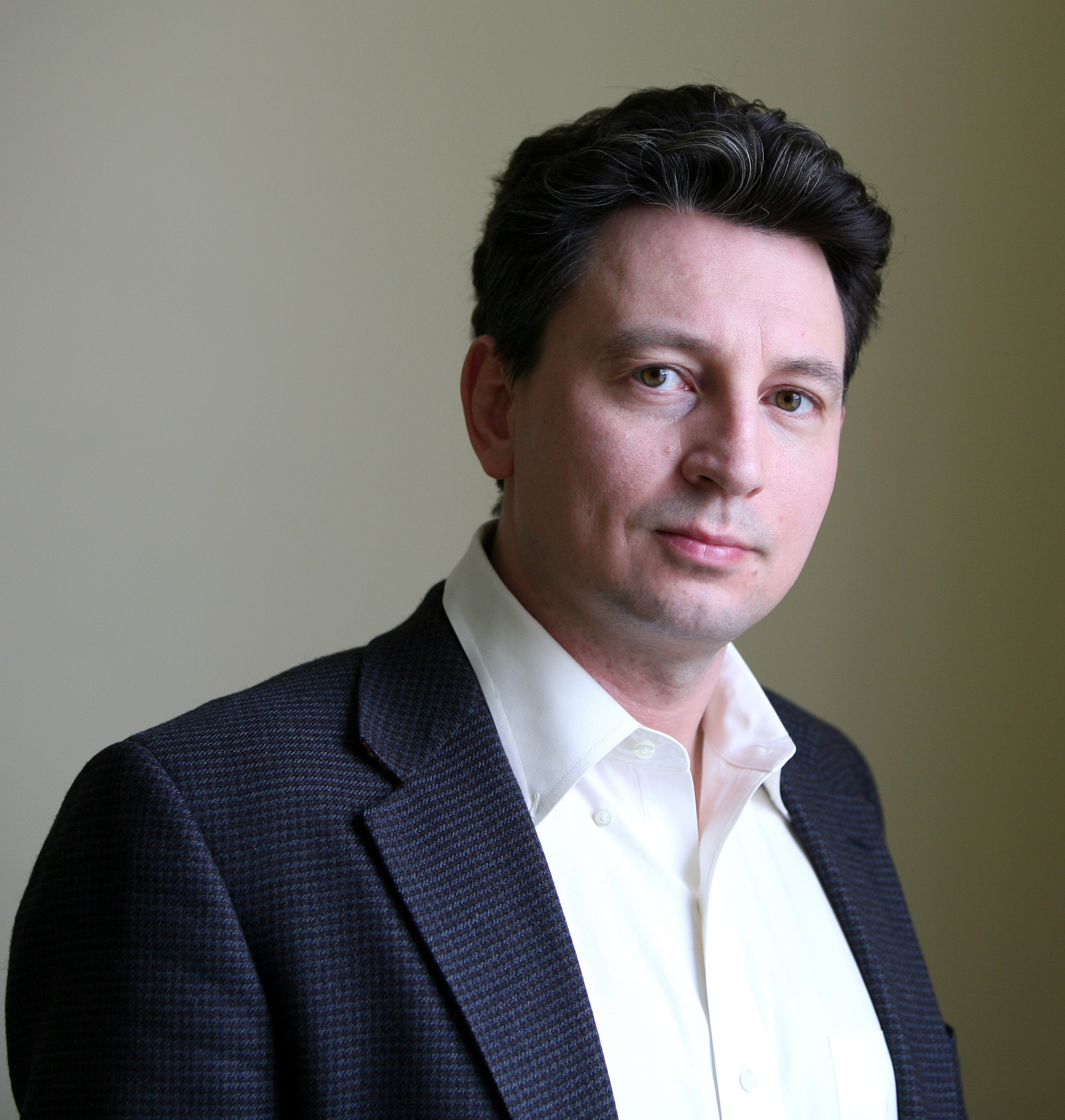
- Born: Moscow, Russia
- Education: Moscow State University; William I. Fine Theoretical Physics Institute
- Scientific career
- Fields: Theoretical physics Condensed matter physics
- Workplaces: Joint Quantum Institute; University of Maryland
- Doctoral advisor: Anatoly Larkin

Victor Galitski is an American physicist, a theorist working in the area of quantum physics.

== Education and career ==
Galitski earned his PhD in applied math (under Prof. Dmitry Sokoloff from the Math Faculty in Moscow State University) and a 2^{nd} PhD in quantum physics under Prof. Anatoly Larkin. Galitski was later a postdoctoral fellow at the Kavli Institute for Theoretical Physics. He has been on the faculty at the University of Maryland since 2005, where he is now a Chesapeake Chair Professor of Theoretical Physics. He is also a Fellow of the Joint Quantum Institute there, an honorary professor at Monash University in Melbourne, Australia, and a foreign partner of the Australian ARC Centre of Excellence in Future Low-Energy Electronics Technologies (FLEET).

Galitski has been awarded the NSF career award, Simons Investigator award, the Open Society Fellowship, and the Future Fellowship from Australian Research Council. His notable researches include the 2010 prediction of topological Kondo insulators. In 2006, he introduced a new kind of spin-orbit coupled Bose-Einstein Condensate. In 2007, together with University of Maryland coworkers including Sankar Das Sarma, Galitski resolved the minimal conductivity puzzle in graphene physics. Together with Gil Refael, Galitski co-introduced Floquet topological insulators.

In July 2021, Galitski published a viral essay on linkedin, entitled "Quantum Computing Hype is Bad for Science," cautioning about unsupported, inflated claims in the quantum computing industry and the dangerous possibility of "quantum Ponzi schemes."

== Books ==
- Galitski, Victor; Karnakov, Boris; Kogan, Vladimir; Galitskii, Victor (2013). Exploring Quantum Mechanics: A Collection of 700+ Solved Problems for Students, Lecturers, and Researchers. London, U.K.: Oxford University Press. ISBN 978-0-19-923272-7.

== Family background ==
Victor Galitski was born in Moscow, Russia in a family of Jewish, German, and Russian ancestry. His grandfather Victor Galitskii (Галицкий,_Виктор_Михайлович) was a renowned physicist, who worked with Lev Landau, and Arkady Migdal, and was director of the theoretical physics department in the Kurchatov Institute.
