= Guenakh Mitselmakher =

Russian-American physicist

Guenakh Mitselmakher was a Russian-American physicist who passed away on January 28, 2026. He joined the University of Florida in 1995 and, since 2004, he was a Distinguished Professor in the Institute for High Energy Physics and Astrophysics at the University of Florida (UFL). His main interests were in gravitational waves and experimental particle physics.

== Career ==
He earned his Ph.D at Joint Institute for Nuclear Research, Dubna, Russia in 1974. After working in Dubna for some years he emigrated in 1991 to the US to work on the Superconducting Super Collider project (SSC) in Dallas, Texas. When the project was cancelled in 1993 he transferred to work on the Compact Muon Solenoid project (CMS), working at the Fermi National Accelerator Laboratory in Chicago from 1994-1998. In 1995 he was also appointed Professor of Physics at UF, rising to Distinguished Professor in 2004.

On September 14, 2015, he contributed to the discovery of GW150914 using his real-time search program Coherent WaveBurst, which identified gravitational wave signals in the Laser Interferometer Gravitational wave Observatory (LIGO) data received at detectors in Livingston, Louisiana and Hanford, Washington.

He was elected a Fellow of the American Physical Society in 2001 "for his early measurement of the pion charge radius and for his leadership role in the design of innovative very high rate muon detectors at hadronic colliders".
