= Peter Fireman =

Russian American chemist, industrialist, and economist.

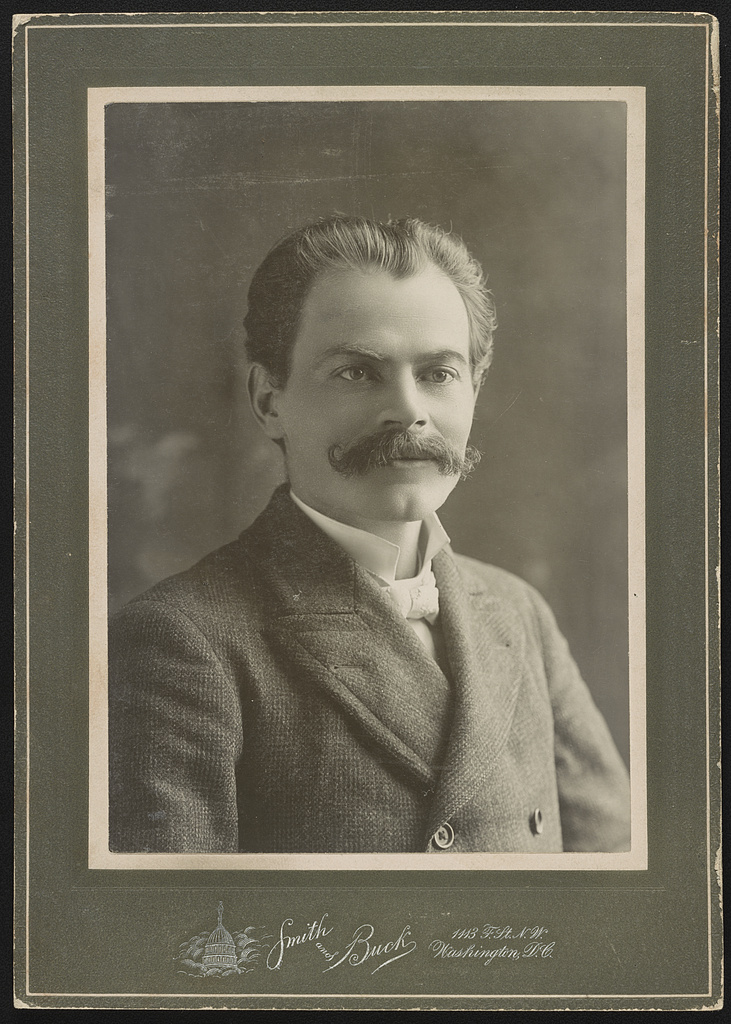
Fireman in 1899

Peter Fireman (4 April 1863 – 27 April 1962) was a Russian American chemist, patentist, industrialist, and economist.

== Biography ==
Fireman was born in Lipovetz, Russian Empire (nowadays Ukraine). Educated in Odesa, he emigrated to the United States in 1882 and found the utopian community of "New Odessa". After the community broke up, Fireman travelled to Zurich to study chemistry and got his Ph.D. at the University of Bern in 1893. There, he met his wife, Ernestine Weitz, and became friends with the social-democratic economist Conrad Schmidt. Fireman later returned to America, where he became president of the American Chemical Society of the Washington section and a wealthy manufacturer in the paint business for his patents on a process for making magnetic oxides of iron. He remarried Frances Marie Metzger in 1929.

== Career ==
Like many Russian economists, Fireman was strongly influenced by Ricardian economics. His most well-known economic work is his attempted solution to the problem of the formation of an average rate of profit without violating the labour theory of value (or "law of value"), challenged by Friedrich Engels in his preface to Karl Marx's Das Kapital, Volume II (see also: Transformation problem). According to Fireman, "aggregate prices remain equal to aggregate values" of the commodities, which are disturbed by competition. Therefore:

"[C]ommodities are sold above their value in all branches of industry where the relation between the capital invested in means of production and the capital invested in wages (or as Marx put it, the relation between constant and variable capital $c:v$) is greatest; which means that commodities are sold below their values in those branches of industry where the relation between constant capital and variable capital is smallest, and that commodities are exchanged at their true value only where the relation $c:v$ represents a definite average level."

Engels praised Fireman's response in his preface to Das Kapital, Volume III, for being very close to Marx's own solution, though not in sufficient detail.

Fireman also published several books and articles on topics such as psychology or philosophy.

== Selected works ==
- Kritik der Marx'schen Werttheorie (1892)
- Christianity, a Tale and Moral (1931)
- Sound Thinking (1947)
- Perceptualistic Theory of Knowledge (1954)
- Justice in Plato's Republic (1957)
