= Tonearm (musician) =

Russian-born American musician

Tonearm performing at Territoria festival in Moscow, Oct. 2006

Tonearm is the stage name of Russian-born, New York-based musician Ilia Bis (Илья Бис). Bis grew up in Moscow and has studied mathematics and computer sound analysis at the University of Chicago. In 2009, Nikola Krastev of Radio Free Europe described Bis as having "a faithful following on both the New York and Moscow club scenes".
