= List of Frontline (American TV program) episodes =

Frontline is an investigative journalism television program from PBS (Public Broadcasting Service), producing in-depth documentaries on a variety of domestic and international stories and issues, and broadcasting them on air and online. Produced at WGBH-TV in Boston, Massachusetts, and distributed through PBS in the United States, the program has received every major award in broadcast journalism. Its investigations have helped breathe new life into terrorism cold cases, freed innocent people from jail, prompted U.N. resolutions, and spurred both policy and social change.

As of July 29, 2025, 843 episodes of Frontline have aired.

== Series overview ==
Season	Episodes	Originally released	
Season	Episodes	First released	Last released
1	25	January 17, 1983	July 18, 1983
2	24	January 16, 1984	December 18, 1984
3	21	January 15, 1985	May 28, 1985
4	31	January 21, 1986	September 9, 1986
5	20	January 27, 1987	December 16, 1987
6	19	January 26, 1988	October 24, 1988
7	19	January 18, 1989	December 13, 1989
8	23	January 23, 1990	December 18, 1990
9	22	January 15, 1991	December 3, 1991
10	23	January 21, 1992	November 24, 1992
11	22	January 19, 1993	December 14, 1993
12	20	January 18, 1994	November 15, 1994
13	19	January 3, 1995	December 12, 1995
14	18	January 9, 1996	November 26, 1996
15	18	January 14, 1997	November 18, 1997
16	16	January 20, 1998	November 3, 1998
17	19	January 12, 1999	November 23, 1999
18	18	January 11, 2000	November 20, 2000
19	17	January 16, 2001	November 22, 2001
20	24	January 10, 2002	November 21, 2002
21	21	January 2, 2003	November 20, 2003
22	17	January 15, 2004	November 23, 2004
23	16	January 25, 2005	November 22, 2005
24	14	January 9, 2006	November 21, 2006
25	18	January 16, 2007	November 20, 2007
26	14	January 8, 2008	November 25, 2008
27	16	January 6, 2009	November 24, 2009
28	18	February 2, 2010	November 23, 2010
29	20	January 11, 2011	November 22, 2011
30	22	January 3, 2012	November 20, 2012
31	21	January 8, 2013	November 26, 2013
32	18	January 7, 2014	December 17, 2014
33	18	January 6, 2015	November 17, 2015
34	18	January 5, 2016	December 27, 2016
35	18	January 3, 2017	November 1, 2017
36	19	January 23, 2018	November 20, 2018
37	17	January 22, 2019	November 19, 2019
38	25	January 7, 2020	December 15, 2020
39	23	2021	2021
40	13	2022	2022
41	19	2023	2023
42	14	2024	2024
43	17	January 21, 2025	December 16, 2025
44	TBA	February 3, 2026	2026

== Episodes ==
=== Season 1 (1983) ===
Frontline's first season, in 1983, was the only season to have Jessica Savitch as its host (Savitch died in October of that year).

No. overall	No. in season	Title	Topic(s)	Running time	Original release date	Prod. code
1	1	"An Unauthorized History of the NFL"	Sports	60 minutes	January 17, 1983	101
A look at the connections between organized crime, gambling and professional football in the United States.
2	2	"88 Seconds in Greensboro"	Extremism, violence	60 minutes	January 24, 1983	102
James Reston Jr. investigates a police informant's involvement with a group of Ku Klux Klan and American Nazi Party members who killed 5 civil rights demonstrators in a November 1979 incident in Greensboro, North Carolina.
3	3	"In the Shadow of the Capitol"	Poverty	60 minutes	January 31, 1983	103
Charlie Cobb explores a rarely seen side of Washington, D.C., where poverty is widespread among the population (75% of which is black).
4	4	"A Chinese Affair"	Asian politics	60 minutes	February 7, 1983	104
A look at Taiwan's political struggle in determining their relations with communist mainland China.
5	5	"God's Banker"	Finance	60 minutes	February 14, 1983	105
Jeremy Paxman explores the career of banker Roberto Calvi, his relations with the Holy See and secret Italian society, and the mystery of his June 1982 death.
6	6	"Pentagon, Inc."	Finance; military	60 minutes	February 21, 1983	106
An investigation into the power of the Pentagon as a business and economic force in U.S. economy.
7	7	"Gunfight USA"	Firearms	60 minutes	February 28, 1983	107
An exploration into the underlying fears that make gun control an emotional issue in the U.S.
8	8	"Children of Pride"	Biographies	60 minutes	March 7, 1983	108
The story of Kojo Odo, a 42-year-old single black man who opened his home to 21 children with physical or mental handicaps.
9	9	"A Journey To Russia"	Diplomacy	60 minutes	March 21, 1983	109
A young, three-person debate team from America travels to the Soviet Union to meet young Russians whose world views contradict their own.
10	10	"Daisy: Story of a Facelift"	Health	60 minutes	March 28, 1983	110
A look into the world of plastic surgery focuses on a 55-year-old woman's desire to undergo a facelift.
11	11	"Space: The Race For High Ground"	Science; military	60 minutes	April 11, 1983	111
A look at the battle between the U.S. and Soviet Union to turn outer space from a world of exploration to one of strategic defense, including the then-recent introduction by U.S. President Ronald Reagan of the Strategic Defense Initiative.
12	12	Abortion Clinic	Health	60 minutes	April 18, 1983	112
An intimate look at the values and decisions both sides hold in the abortion debate.
13	13	"Crisis in Zimbabwe"	African politics	60 minutes	April 25, 1983	113
Charlie Cobb explores how a rift between two of Zimbabwe's leaders threatens to divide the country among tribal lines.
14	14	"Air Crash"	Transportation	60 minutes	May 2, 1983	114
How human greed and legal machinations led to the July 1982 crash of Pan Am Flight 759.
15	15	"Looking For Mao"	Asian politics	60 minutes	May 9, 1983	115
A look at a new cultural revolution inside China, one that finds political and social relaxations that run counter to Mao Zedong's anti-capitalist dictates.
16	16	"Israel: Between The River and The Sea"	Biographies	60 minutes	May 16, 1983	116
The story of Rafik Halabi, the only Arab reporter working in the Hebrew section of Israeli Television, and how his identity and loyalty became a national controversy.
17	17	In Our Water	Health	60 minutes	May 23, 1983	117
This Oscar-nominated documentary looks at the Kaler family's 6-year battle with local and federal officials over contamination (from a nearby landfill) of their water well in South Brunswick, New Jersey.
18	18	"Vietnam Memorial"	Military; psychology	60 minutes	May 30, 1983	118
A look at the October 1982 dedication of the Vietnam Veterans Memorial and the pain and emotions that survivors, parents, and friends of the memorialized still feel about the war.
19	19	"For the Good of All"	Land development	60 minutes	June 6, 1983	119
Jessica Savitch looks at the National Park Service's controversial reclamation of land to make way for the Cuyahoga Valley National Recreation Area in Ohio.
20	20	"The Russians Are Here"	Foreign diplomacy	60 minutes	June 13, 1983	120
A look at Russian emigrants to the U.S. and their difficulties in adjusting to American society.
21	21	"Who Decides Disability?"	Health	60 minutes	June 20, 1983	121
A look at the Reagan administration's effort to remove tens of thousands of people from Social Security disability rolls.
22	22	"Crossfire El Salvador"	Central America	60 minutes	June 27, 1983	122
A look at the deadly civil war in El Salvador, where death, torture, and disappearances are everyday occurrences.
23	23	"Sanctuary"	Central America	60 minutes	July 4, 1983	123
A look at the plight of people seeking refuge from US-allied governments in Central America focuses on a Guatemalan family's journey through a new "underground railroad".
24	24	"Moneylenders"	Finance	60 minutes	July 11, 1983	124
Anthony Sampson looks at the difficulties developing countries have in repaying loans to Western banks, who fear financial catastrophe as a result.
25	25	"Klaus Barbie: The American Connection"	Criminal justice; war	60 minutes	July 18, 1983	125
A collaboration with the BBC looks into how U.S. intelligence relied on Klaus Barbie in their anti-Communist efforts, and whether the government was culpable in protecting the former Gestapo officer from being brought to justice for his crimes in World War II.

=== Season 2 (1984) ===
Season 2 of Frontline saw Judy Woodruff become the show's host after Jessica Savitch's death.

No. overall	No. in season	Title	Topic(s)	Running time	Original release date	Prod. code
26	1	"Crisis at General Hospital"	Health	60 minutes	January 16, 1984	201
An examination of how many investor-owned, for-profit hospital chains aggressively market themselves to treat only insured or wealthy patients.
27	2	"We Are Driven"	Business/economy/financial	60 minutes	January 23, 1984	202
A look at the tough management style employed by Nissan Motor Company at its operations in both Japan and Smyrna, Tennessee.
28	3	"The Old Man and the Gun"	Foreign affairs	60 minutes	February 6, 1984	203
A look at the support Irish Americans have for the IRA and its violent strategy in Northern Ireland's catholic-Protestant conflict.
29	4	"Give Me that Big Time Religion"	Religion	60 minutes	February 13, 1984	204
An investigation into whether money raised by televangelists goes toward "God's work" or towards keeping the preachers on the air.
30	5	"The Campaign for Page One"	Politics; media	60 minutes	February 27, 1984	205
An inside look at the candidates in the presidential campaign and the reporters who cover them.
31 32	6 7	"The Mind of a Murderer (Parts 1 and 2)"	Criminal justice	60 minutes	March 19, 1984 March 26, 1984	206 207
A two-part look into the case of Kenneth Bianchi, who committed murders in Los Angeles (as one of the "Hillside Stranglers") and Bellingham, Washington yet sought to avoid trial by claiming mental incompetence.
33	8	"The Struggle for Birmingham"	Politics	60 minutes	April 2, 1984	208
A look at the modern-day black political power focuses on Birmingham, Alabama, a key battlefield in the civil rights struggle of the 1960s.
34	9	"Captive in El Salvador"	Foreign affairs	60 minutes	April 16, 1984	209
Ofra Bikel looks at the politics and people of El Salvador that the U.S. lends support to.
35	10	"Chasing the Basketball Dream"	Sports	60 minutes	April 23, 1984	210
Charlie Cobb looks at the successes and failures of inner-city blacks seeking to make it big by playing basketball.
36	11	"The Other Side of the Track (rebroadcast as King of the World)"	Sports	60 minutes	May 7, 1984	211
A look at two racetracks on opposite ends of the thoroughbred racing spectrum, the famed Belmont Park in suburban New York and the struggling Great Barrington Fair in Western Massachusetts.
37	12	"Return of the Great White Fleet"	Military	60 minutes	May 14, 1984	212
A profile of Navy Secretary John Lehman and his efforts to build a "600-ship Navy".
38	13	"Warning from Gangland"	Social issues	60 minutes	May 21, 1984	213
A look at efforts to counter the street gang problem in Los Angeles, where violent conflicts have claimed the lives of gang members and innocent bystanders alike.
39	14	"Bread, Butter, and Politics"	Social issues	60 minutes	June 4, 1984	214
A look at the human and political aspects of hunger in the United States.
40	15	"Man's Best Friends"	Health & medicine	60 minutes	June 18, 1984	215
A look at the medical necessities of and ethical arguments over animal testing in American laboratories, hospitals, and medical schools.
41	16	"So You Want to Be President"	Politics	120 minutes	October 9, 1984	216
A look at the unsuccessful presidential campaign of Colorado Senator Gary Hart.
42	17	"Welcome to America"	Biographies	60 minutes	October 16, 1984	217
Profiles of 4 people who fled the repression of Communist Poland for a better life in Chicago.
43	18	"Not One of the Boys"	Politics	60 minutes	October 23, 1984	218
Judy Woodruff looks at the political role of women during the 1984 election season.
44	19	"Living Below the Line"	Business/economy/financial	60 minutes	October 30, 1984	219
A profile of Farrell Stallings, newly laid off from his place of employment and venturing into the bureaucratic maze of the welfare system.
45	20	"The Arab and the Israeli"	Foreign affairs	60 minutes	November 13, 1984	220
Two men (one Palestinian, the other Israeli) journey to America to promote a solution for the hotly debated West Bank territory.
46	21	"Better Off Dead?"	Health & medicine	60 minutes	November 20, 1984	221
An intimate look into the issues doctors, lawyers, and parents face regarding medical treatment for infants born with severe physical and mental injuries.
47	22	"Cry, Ethiopia, Cry"	Health; foreign affairs	60 minutes	November 27, 1984	222
A look at the famine in Ethiopia.
48	23	"Red Star Over Khyber"	Foreign affairs; Middle East	60 minutes	December 11, 1984	223
Richard Reeves at Pakistan's acceptance of Afghani refugees from the war-torn country.
49	24	"Marshall High Fights Back"	Education	60 minutes	December 18, 1984	224
A look at Chicago's Marshall Metropolitan High School and its struggles to upgrade its academic standards.

=== Season 3 (1985) ===
No. overall	No. in season	Title	Topic(s)	Running time	Original release date	Prod. code
50	1	"Vietnam Under Communism"	Asian affairs	60 minutes	January 15, 1985	301
A rare look inside Vietnam 10 years after the fall of Saigon and the tangible and emotional legacies of the war on the country.
51 52	2 3	"Shootout on the Imperial Highway (Parts 1 and 2)"	Criminal justice; gang violence	60 minutes	January 22, 1985 January 29, 1985	302 303
A two-part report on gang wars in the Watts section of Los Angeles. Part 1 focuses on the efforts of James Hawkins, Sr. and his family to combat youth gangs and their criminal activities. Part 2 focuses on how gangs form and the threat they pose to the general public.
53	4	"The Lifer and the Lady"	Prison reform	90 minutes	February 5, 1985	304
The story of the relationship between convicted murder Ron Cooney and prison volunteer Lesley Earl.
54	5	"The Child Savers"	Family/children	60 minutes	February 12, 1985	305
A profile of New York's Emergency Children's Service and their efforts to confront child abuse cases.
55	6	"Down for the Count"	Sports	60 minutes	February 19, 1985	306
A look at the world of boxing; the fighters, promoters, and fans who love it; and the critics who want to ban it.
56	7	"Retreat from Beirut"	Foreign affairs	60 minutes	February 26, 1985	307
One year after the U.S. withdrawal from Lebanon (which followed the 1983 Beirut barracks bombings), William Greider examines the withdrawal and its repercussions.
57	8	"Buying the Bomb"	Foreign affairs	60 minutes	March 5, 1985	308
Seymour Hersh tells the story of a Pakistani businessman who tried to ship electrical devices which can be used as nuclear bomb triggers out of the US to Pakistan.
58	9	A Class Divided	Social issues; education	60 minutes	March 26, 1985	309
William Peters follows up on his 1970 TV documentary Eye of the Storm, which chronicled Jane Elliott's dividing her otherwise homogeneous 3rd grade class by their eye color in a lesson on discrimination.
59	10	"Potomac Fever"	Politics	60 minutes	April 2, 1985	310
Profiles of two freshmen members of the United States House of Representatives, Pete Visclosky and Tom DeLay
60	11	"Crisis in Central America Part 1: Yankee Years"	Foreign affairs	60 minutes	April 9, 1985	311
Part 1 of a 4-part look at the history of US relations in Central America and the Caribbean profiles American preeminence in the region from the Spanish–American War in the 1890s through the mid-1950s.
61	12	"Crisis in Central America Part 2: Castro's Challenge"	Foreign affairs	60 minutes	April 10, 1985	312
A profile of the Cuban Revolution and the communist country's troubled relations with the United States.
62	13	"Crisis in Central America Part 3: Revolution in Nicaragua"	Foreign affairs	60 minutes	April 11, 1985	313
A look at the U.S. involvement in and struggle for control of the Nicaraguan Revolution.
63	14	"Crisis in Central America Part 4: Battle for El Salvador"	Foreign affairs	60 minutes	April 12, 1985	314
A look at the evolution of the Salvadoran Civil War and U.S. relations with El Salvador.
64	15	"Men Who Molest"	Family/children; criminal reform	60 minutes	April 16, 1985	315
An examination of a Seattle program aimed at adults who sexually abuse children and the issue of whether they should be punished, treated, or both.
65	16	"Catholics in America: Is Nothing Sacred?"	Religion	60 minutes	April 23, 1985	316
A look at the conflict American Catholics have with church doctrine.
66	17	"The American Way of War"	Military	60 minutes	April 30, 1985	317
The relationship between the United States Army, its doctrine in modern warfare, and the American government and citizens.
67	18	"Memory of the Camps"	History	60 minutes	May 7, 1985	318
The premiere of footage from an unfinished 1945 documentary made by British and American filmmakers (Alfred Hitchcock among them) who followed Allied armies into Nazi concentration camps to capture post-liberation images.
68	19	"You Are in the Computer"	Housing	60 minutes	May 14, 1985	319
Robert Krulwich investigates computerized information systems and their roles in landlords denying rentals to prospective tenants.
69	20	"What About Mom and Dad?"	Family; health	60 minutes	May 21, 1985	320
A profile of the decisions and issues adult children face in caring for their aging parents.
70	21	"Breaking the Bank"	Finance	60 minutes	May 28, 1985	321
Judy Woodruff investigates the cases of Oklahoma City-based Penn Square Bank and Chicago-based Continental Illinois and their implications on the broader U.S. banking system.

=== Season 4 (1986) ===
During its fourth season, Frontline presented Comrades, a 12-part documentary series that originally aired on the BBC in Great Britain. Comrades profiled everyday life in and citizens of the Soviet Union through interviews and fly on the wall filming. Frontline's presentation of Comrades featured "wraparound" segments where host Judy Woodruff interviewed Richard Denton and other Comrades producers about the episode's background.

No. overall	No. in season	Title	Topic(s)	Running time	Original release date	Prod. code
71	1	"Hostage in Iran"	History; recollections	60 minutes	January 21, 1986	401
Five years after their release, those held hostage in Iran by Islamic revolutionaries tell the story of their 444-day ordeal.
72	2	"Sue the Doctor?"	Health	60 minutes	January 28, 1986	402
An inside look at the battle between doctors and lawyers over medical malpractice suits.
73	3	"Growing Up Poor"	Social issues	60 minutes	February 4, 1986	403
Profiles of children in Chester, Pennsylvania who are growing up in impoverished conditions.
74	4	"Russia: Love It or Leave It"	Foreign relations	60 minutes	February 11, 1986	404
A group of American tourists escape a government-managed tour of the Soviet Union in an effort to gain insight from everyday Soviets.
75	5	"Tobacco on Trial"	Health	60 minutes	February 18, 1986	405
Judy Woodruff looks at a trio of lawsuits filed by lifelong smokers seeking damages from tobacco companies over their declining health.
76	6	"Divorce Wars"	Family/children	60 minutes	February 25, 1986	406
Profiles of the couples, lawyers, judges, and children caught in divorce proceedings.
77	7	"Who's Running this War?"	Foreign affairs	60 minutes	March 18, 1986	407
A probe into the legality of covert aid provided by the U.S. to contra rebels in Nicaragua.
78	8	"AIDS: A National Inquiry"	Health	120 minutes	March 25, 1986	408
A look into the AIDS crisis begins with the case of a homosexual prostitute who, before he succumbed to the disease, continued to have unprotected sex with several men. In the second hour, Harvard Law School professor Charles Nesson moderates a discussion on issues of civil liberties, public safety, education, and medical progress about AIDS.
79	9	"Standoff in Mexico"	Foreign affairs	60 minutes	April 1, 1986	409
A look at growing unrest in Mexico caused by election fraud and corruption involving the ruling Institutional Revolutionary Party.
80	10	"Inside the Jury Room"	Criminal justice	60 minutes	April 8, 1986	410
An exclusive look inside a jury room during deliberations in a criminal trial in Wisconsin.
81	11	"Taxes Behind Closed Doors"	Politics	60 minutes	April 15, 1986	411
William Greider offers a behind-the-scenes look at Congressmen and lobbyists involved in the politics of tax reform.
82	12	"The Disillusionment of David Stockman"	Economics	60 minutes	April 20, 1986	412
Former OMB Chairman David Stockman offers a candid look at the "free lunch fiscal policy" of the Reagan Administration.
83	13	"Vision of Star Wars"	National defense	60 minutes	April 22, 1986	413
Bill Kurtis heads a Frontline/NOVA collaboration examining the scientific and political implications of the Strategic Defense Initiative.
84	14	"Hollywood Dreams"	Entertainment	60 minutes	May 13, 1986	414
A look into the fantasy and reality of the multibillion-dollar motion picture industry.
85	15	"The Bloods of 'Nam"	Military; discrimination	60 minutes	May 20, 1986	415
Wallace Terry interviews black veterans of the Vietnam War who fought three battles—against Communist forces, discrimination in the military, and post-war disillusionment at home.
86	16	"A Matter of the Mind"	Health	60 minutes	May 27, 1986	416
An examination of mental illness from the point of view of residents in a St. Paul home, who deal with not only their psychological demons but also social stigma. Audio clips from this episode were featured in the Pearl Jam song "Stupid Mop".
87	17	"Holy War, Holy Terror"	Foreign affairs	60 minutes	June 3, 1986	417
John Laurence examines how Iran's war with Iraq is a steeping stone in spreading a radical brand of Islam throughout the world.
88	18	"Will There Always Be an England?"	Economics	60 minutes	June 10, 1986	418
Ofra Bikel looks at the strained social structure in Great Britain, where unemployment is common in northern areas but power and privilege prevail in the south of the country.
89	19	"Assault on Affirmative Action"	Social issues	60 minutes	June 17, 1986	419
A look into the 20-year conflict over affirmative action policies in the U.S.
Comrades documentary
90	20	Comrades I: The Education of Rita	Biography	60 minutes	July 1, 1986	COM101
The life and ambitions of a Komsomol member and school graduate as she begins her first teaching job in Moscow.
91	21	Comrades II: Hunter and Son	Biography	60 minutes	July 8, 1986	COM102
The story of a hunter and his young son hunting for sable and other valuable fur animals in the Siberian taiga.
92	22	Comrades III: All that Jazz	Music	60 minutes	July 15, 1986	COM103
A look at musical subcultures (jazz and rock) unapproved by Soviet government features the performances of Sergey Kuryokhin.
93	23	Comrades IV: The Trial of Tamara Russo	Criminal justice	60 minutes	July 22, 1986	COM104
The Soviet justice system is examined through the trial of a hospital orderly accused of theft and the female judge presiding over the case.
94	24	Comrades V: Master of Samarkand	Religion	60 minutes	July 29, 1986	COM105
A look at Muslim life in the USSR focuses on a master craftsman of Uzbek heritage who for 35 years has been restoring the great Islamic mosques in Samarkand.
95	25	Comrades VI: Pacific Outpost	Biography	60 minutes	August 5, 1986	COM106
A profile of a workaholic communist official; her husband, who cares for their two daughters; and their lives in the Soviet Pacific coast town of Nakhodka.
96	26	Comrades VII: Steel Mill Soccer	Biography; sports	60 minutes	August 12, 1986	COM107
The lives of players on a factory soccer team in Azerbaijan as they fight for the town championship.
97	27	Comrades VIII: Doctor in Moscow	Biography	60 minutes	August 19, 1986	COM108
A day in the life of a successful, well-to-do Moscow eye surgeon reveals what life is like for privileged Soviet citizens.
98	28	Comrades IX: Baltic Chic	Culture	60 minutes	August 26, 1986	COM109
The influences of Western culture on Soviet society and fashion as seen through a fashion designer in Tallinn, Estonia.
99	29	Comrades X: Soldier Boy	Biography	60 minutes	August 26, 1986	COM110
A look at the exertion and boredom of basic Soviet military training focuses on an 18-year-old recruit and his parents who worry he may be sent to fight in Afghanistan.
100	30	Comrades XI: October Harvest	Biography	60 minutes	September 2, 1986	COM111
Collective farm life in southern Russia as seen through one family's work during harvest time.
101	31	Comrades XII: Leningrad Movie	Entertainment	60 minutes	September 9, 1986	COM112
A profile of a director in the state-funded Soviet film industry who controversially dares to depart from the state-approved script.

=== Season 5 (1987) ===
The end of Frontline's 5th season featured the documentary Apartheid. Spanning over 3 centuries, the 5-part historical documentary looked into the background and practice by South Africa's government of apartheid, the institutionalized form of racial segregation that favored the country's white minority at the expense of its indigenous black population.

No. overall	No. in season	Title	Topic(s)	Running time	Original release date	Prod. code
102	1	"The Real Stuff"	Science	60 minutes	January 27, 1987	501
A look at the problems and politics plaguing NASA one year after the Space Shuttle Challenger disaster.
103	2	"The Earthquake Is Coming"	Science	60 minutes	February 3, 1987	502
A look at the wide-ranging effects that could occur if and when a devastating earthquake strikes California.
104 105	3 4	"Stopping Drugs"	Health	60 minutes	February 10, 1987 February 17, 1987	503 504
A two-part examination of America's war on drugs. Part 1 looks at the effectiveness of drug treatment programs and addicts' struggles. Part 2 looks into the effectiveness of anti-drug efforts in schools.
106	5	"The Nazi Connection"	Science, foreign affairs	60 minutes	February 24, 1987	505
An examination of Operation Paperclip, in which the US Government brought scientists, engineers, and technicians from Nazi Germany after World War II for government projects, and whether some of their connections to the Nazi government were "sanitized".
107	6	"Desperately Seeking Baby"	Family/children	60 minutes	March 3, 1987	506
A look into the practice of childless couples turning to private adoption deals brokered by lawyers and counselors, and the ambiguity and heartbreak that can result.
108	7	"Street Cop"	Criminal justice	60 minutes	March 31, 1987	507
A look at street cops in one of Boston's busiest and most violent police districts.
109	8	"The Secret File"	National security	60 minutes	April 14, 1987	508
The story of Penn Kimball and his efforts to clear his name after the US Government had branded him a national security risk.
110	9	"War on Nicaragua"	Foreign affairs	60 minutes	April 21, 1987	509
William Greider looks into how the US Government began and continues its support of Contra rebels in Nicaragua.
111	10	"The Bombing of West Philly"	Law enforcement, race	60 minutes	May 5, 1987	510
A look into tensions between Philadelphia's police and the black liberation group MOVE, which led to a May 1985 standoff that ended with police bombing MOVE's compound.
112	11	"In Search of the Marcos Millions"	Financial	60 minutes	May 26, 1987	511
An investigation into where Ferdinand and Imelda Marcos hid millions of dollars after the former Philippine first couple left in exile in 1986.
113	12	"Israel: The Price of Victory"	Middle East	60 minutes	June 2, 1987	512
A look into Israel's struggles with image and democracy on the 20th anniversary of the Six-Day War.
114	13	"Death of a Porn Queen"	Biographies	60 minutes	June 9, 1987	513
Al Austin examines the life and suicide of a young girl involved in the porn industry.
115	14	"Keeping the Faith"	Religion, race	60 minutes	June 16, 1987	514
Roger Wilkins looks at the evolution of the Black church in a time of a growing Black middle class.
116	15	"The Politics of Greed"	Politics	60 minutes	June 23, 1987	515
A look at the effects of corruption on a city government's day-to-day operations.
Apartheid documentary
117	16	"Apartheid Part 1: 1652–1948"	History, race/multicultural	60 minutes	December 14, 1987	516
A look at the precursors to apartheid in South Africa, from colonial times to the rise of the ANC, Afrikaner nationalism, and practices of white favoritism by governments.
118	17	"Apartheid Part 2: 1948–1963"	History, race/multicultural	60 minutes	December 14, 1987	517
A white nationalist government implements strict segregational practices (racial classifications, separate-and-unequal schooling, forcible relocation of Blacks) and gives it the name "apartheid" — but not without facing a Nelson Mandela-led resistance.
119	18	"Apartheid Part 3: 1963–1977"	History, race/multicultural	60 minutes	December 15, 1987	518
A look at the South African government's establishment of rural bantustans and the rise of Back resistance to homeland policy, which culminates in the 1976 Soweto uprising.
120	19	"Apartheid Part 4: 1978–1986"	History, race/multicultural	60 minutes	December 15, 1987	519
Prime minister P. W. Botha implements reforms to maintain white supremacy in South Africa, moves that provoked negative reactions from Afrikaners and Blacks alike.
121	20	"Apartheid Part 5: 1987"	Race/multicultural	60 minutes	December 16, 1987	520
A look at an unprecedented meeting in Dakar, Senegal where dissident white Afrikaners and Black leaders from the ANC met to discuss strategies for change in South Africa.

=== Season 6 (1988) ===
No. overall	No. in season	Title	Topic(s)	Running time	Original release date	Prod. code
122	1	"Praise the Lord"	Financial, religion	60 minutes	January 26, 1988	601
The rise and fall of Jim & Tammy Bakker and why government agencies failed to investigate claims of corruption within their evangelical empire.
123	2	"Operation Urgent Fury"	Foreign affairs	60 minutes	February 2, 1988	602
Seymour Hersh investigates the US Military's October 1983 invasion of Grenada, the military shortcomings it laid bare, and whether it jeopardized the lives of the American college students it was meant to protect.
124	3	"The Man Who Shot John Lennon"	Biographies	60 minutes	February 9, 1988	603
A portrait of Mark David Chapman and his motivations for murdering John Lennon in 1980.
125	4	"Your Flight Is Cancelled"	Transportation	60 minutes	February 16, 1988	604
A look at the difficulties facing the air traffic system, which have included an environment of delays, cancellations, and near-collisions post-deregulation.
126	5	"Shakedown in Santa Fe"	Law enforcement	60 minutes	February 23, 1988	605
A profile of life in the Penitentiary of New Mexico, site of one of the most violent prisoner uprisings in US history in 1980.
127	6	"Let My Daughter Die"	Health	60 minutes	March 1, 1988	606
The complex legal and moral issues surrounding the case of Nancy Cruzan, the subject of what would become the Supreme Court's first right to die case.
128	7	"Back in the USSR"	Culture	60 minutes	March 29, 1988	607
Twenty years after moving to Moscow on assignment for TIME, journalist Jerry Schecter and his family return to renew friendships and explore the USSR under glasnost.
129	8	"Poison and the Pentagon"	Military, health	60 minutes	April 5, 1988	608
Joe Rosenbloom looks into the Defense Department's poor record of cleaning up the ground water pollution it has caused.
130	9	To a Safer Place	Family/children	60 minutes	April 12, 1988	609
Sexually abused by her father from infancy until running away at 14, Shirley Turcotte returns to her Winnipeg hometown to face the adults who failed to protect her, the siblings who were also abused, and the horrific childhood she seeks to make peace with.
131	10	"Murder on the Río San Juan"	Terror, Central America	60 minutes	April 19, 1988	610
A look at the motives and possible conspirators in a 1984 bombing that targeted Nicaraguan contra leader Edén Pastora.
132	11	"American Game, Japanese Rules"	Culture	60 minutes	April 26, 1988	611
Intimate profiles of Americans living and working in Japan and trying to adjust to the country's culture.
133	12	"Racism 101"	Social issues	60 minutes	May 10, 1988	612
An examination into the increase in racial incidents and violence on America's college campuses.
134	13	"Guns, Drugs, and the CIA"	Foreign affairs	60 minutes	May 17, 1988	613
A look into the CIA's long history of involvement with drug smugglers in trouble spots around the world, all in the name of national security.
135	14	"The Defense of Europe"	Foreign affairs	60 minutes	May 24, 1988	614
A Frontline/Time joint examination into the new realities facing NATO following the American-Soviet nuclear arms treaty.
136	15	"Trouble in Paradise"	Foreign affairs	60 minutes	May 31, 1988	615
How attempts by the US Government to forge a military pact with Palau has affected the Pacific Ocean country of just 15,000 people.
137	16	"Who Pays for AIDS?"	Health	60 minutes	June 7, 1988	616
How the battle between local governments and Washington over who will cover the cost of the AIDS crisis has impacted patients and communities.
138	17	"Our Forgotten War"	Foreign affairs	60 minutes	June 14, 1988	617
A fresh look at the civil war in El Salvador and how it is affecting the US Government's involvement in the conflict.
139	18	"Indian Country"	Social issues	60 minutes	June 21, 1988	618
Mark Trahant looks at how the business and treaty success of the Quinault Indian Nation is countered by issues of poverty and unemployment among its people.
140	19	"My Husband is Going to Kill Me"	Social issues	60 minutes	June 28, 1988	619
How the justice system in Colorado failed to protect Pamela Guenther from her violent husband, who murdered her in front of their children in February 1987.
141	1	"The Politics of Prosperity"	Economics	60 minutes	October 10, 1988	700A
In the last weeks of the 1988 presidential campaign, correspondent William Greider explores the private but increasingly intense debate about what the next president should do to avoid economic disaster, how and when should he do it, and who will be asked to bear the burden. Frontline focuses on four communities that have not shared in the prosperity of the Reagan years.
142	2	"The Choice"	Biographies	100 minutes	October 24, 1988	700B
In Frontline's first quadrennial profile of the presidential candidates, Garry Wills offers backgrounds of and thoughts from people who know candidates George Bush and Michael Dukakis. (A Frontline collaboration with TIME)

=== Season 7 (1989) ===
Frontline's 7th season was Judy Woodruff's last as on-air host.

No. overall	No. in season	Title	Topic(s)	Running time	Original release date	Prod. code
143	3	"The Real Life of Ronald Reagan"	Biographies	90 minutes	January 18, 1989	701
A profile of Ronald Reagan two days before his departure from the US presidency.
144	4	"The Spy Who Broke the Code"	National security	60 minutes	January 24, 1989	702
An assessment of the damage to US national security from John Anthony Walker's spying for the Soviet Union.
145	5	"The Battle for Eastern Airlines"	Transportation	60 minutes	January 31, 1989	703
Robert Kuttner looks at the management and labor struggles plaguing Eastern Air Lines.
146	6	"Running with Jesse"	Politics	60 minutes	February 7, 1989	704
A look at the 1988 presidential run of Jesse Jackson.
147	7	"Children of the Night"	Social issues	60 minutes	February 14, 1989	705
The problem of teenage runaways and suicides as seen through the case of Iain Brown, who left home at 13 for the life of a male hustler in San Francisco.
148	8	"Who Profits from Drugs"	War on drugs	60 minutes	February 21, 1989	706
How the American economy uses the profits from the illegal drug trade.
149	9	"Prescriptions for Profit"	Health, business	60 minutes	March 28, 1989	707
The practice of pharmaceutical manufacturers marketing and influencing doctors to prescribe medications.
150	10	"The Dallas Drug War"	War on drugs	60 minutes	April 4, 1989	708
Bob Ray Sanders explores how one Dallas neighborhood is struggling to combat the drugs and violence plaguing its community.
151	11	"Murder in the Amazon"	Environment	60 minutes	April 11, 1989	709
The life of Brazilian trade union leader and environmentalist Chico Mendes, and how his December 1988 murder put a focus on the ecological pillage of the Amazon rainforest.
152	12	"The Shakespeare Mystery"	Biographies	60 minutes	April 18, 1989	710
A look at a controversial literary theory: Whether Edward de Vere, 17th Earl of Oxford, was the real William Shakespeare.
153	13	"Extraordinary People"	Health	60 minutes	May 2, 1989	711
Judy Woodruff profiles three Canadian children who had malformations caused by their mothers' use of thalidomide during pregnancy.
154	14	"Yellowstone Under Fire"	Environment	60 minutes	May 9, 1989	712
How accelerated natural resource development during the Reagan Administration affected Yellowstone National Park.
155	15	"Israel: The Covert Connection"	Foreign affairs	60 minutes	May 16, 1989	713
The history of the US government's defense and intelligence alliances with Israel from the 1950s to the present.
156	16	"Remember My Lai"	Defense	60 minutes	May 23, 1989	714
A look at the My Lai Massacre from the surviving US soldiers and Vietnamese citizens who survived.
157	17	"Babies at Risk"	Health	60 minutes	May 23, 1989	715
How political and bureaucratic neglect fueled the high rate of infant mortality in some Chicago neighborhoods.
158	18	"Death of a Terrorist"	Biographies	60 minutes	June 13, 1989	716
The life and death of Irish Republican Army terrorist Mairead Farrell and how the British government deals with political terrorism.
159	19	"Who's Killing Calvert City?"	Environment	60 minutes	June 20, 1989	717
A look at the struggles of Calvert City, Kentucky, a town plagued by pollution and toxic waste generated by the chemical plants that drive its economy.
160	1	"Tracking the Pan Am Bombers"	Terrorism	60 minutes	November 28, 1989	800
A look into the Pan Am Flight 103 bombing in December 1988, including those suspected to have been responsible and whether unheeded warnings and blunders by German police may have contributed to the tragedy.
161	2	"The Right to Die?"	Social issues	120 minutes	December 13, 1989	801
An expanded examination into the subject of Season 6's "Let My Daughter Die", delving into the broad issues surrounding a right to die case argued before the US Supreme Court one week before this broadcast. (A collaboration of Frontline and Fred Friendly's Media & Society Series)

=== Season 8 (1990) ===
Beginning with Season 8, Frontline would eschew from using a regular on-air host, using an off-screen narrator to introduce each episode.

As part of its 8th season, Frontline aired the 4-part documentary The Decade of Destruction. Produced by Adrian Cowell, the series spotlighted the destruction of Brazil's Amazon rainforest, regarded as one of Earth's "last great frontier[s]", during the decade of the 1980s.

No. overall	No. in season	Title	Topic(s)	Running time	Original release date	Prod. code
162	1	"The Bombing of Pan Am 103"	Terrorism	60 minutes	January 23, 1990	802
The efforts of those who lost loved ones in the Pan Am Flight 103 bombing to seek justice, improve air security, and improve government efforts to respond to terrorists and their supporters.
163	2	"The Noriega Connection"	Foreign affairs	60 minutes	January 30, 1990	803
The rise and fall of Manuel Noriega and the US' relationship with the Panamanian general they ousted from power in December 1989.
164	3	"Miss USSR"	Culture	60 minutes	February 6, 1990	804
A behind-the-scenes look at the Soviet Union's first beauty pageant and the broader struggles facing women in the communist country.
165	4	"Throwaway People"	Race	60 minutes	February 13, 1990	805
Roger Wilkins investigates the economic and social roots of the African American underclass, focusing on the struggles of young Black men in one Washington, DC neighborhood.
166	5	"The Faces of Arafat"	Biographies	60 minutes	February 27, 1990	806
Marie Colvin profiles Yasser Arafat and the PLO leader's newfound commitment to reject terrorism and accept Israel's right to exist.
167	6	"Anatomy of an Oil Spill"	Environment	60 minutes	March 20, 1990	807
How complacency and negligence by government agencies and oil companies helped lead to the Exxon Valdez oil spill.
168	7	"Poland: The Morning After"	Economics	60 minutes	March 27, 1990	808
A look at Poland's change from communism to capitalism in the months following the once-banned Solidarity trade union's rise to government.
169	8	"Born in Africa"	Economics	90 minutes	April 3, 1990	809
Peter Jennings narrates the story of Philly Bongoley Lutaaya and how he inspired his fellow Ugandans to fight the spread of AIDS before his death from the disease.
170	9	"New Harvest, Old Shame"	Social issues	60 minutes	April 17, 1990	810
Thirty years after Edward R. Murrow's Harvest of Shame documentary, David Marash looks at the continuing plight of migrant farm workers and the forces that keep their lives so desperate.
171	10	"Hilary in Hiding"	Family/children	60 minutes	April 24, 1990	811
A look at the case of Elizabeth Morgan, who served a 25-month jail term for civil contempt after refusing to divulge the whereabouts of her daughter, Hilary, who Morgan suspected had been sexually assaulted by Hilary's father.
172	11	"Other People's Money"	Finance	60 minutes	May 1, 1990	812
A look at the savings and loan crisis and the role of politics in the failure of Lincoln Savings and Loan Association.
173	12	"Plunder!"	Criminal justice	60 minutes	May 8, 1990	813
Carl Nagin looks into how ancient artifacts looted from pre-Columbian tombs in Latin America wound up in auction houses, galleries, museums, and private collections in the United States.
174	13	"Seven Days in Bensonhurst"	Race	60 minutes	May 15, 1990	814
Shelby Steele examines the dynamics of racial politics surrounding the 1989 murder of Yusef Hawkins by white youths in Bensonhurst, Brooklyn.
175	14	"Inside the Cartel"	War on drugs	60 minutes	May 22, 1990	815
How the drug cartels in Medellín and Cali have become part of Colombia's political and economic life.
176	15	"Teacher, Teacher"	Education	60 minutes	June 12, 1990	816
The hopes and frustrations of public school teachers in one Midwestern town as they face the threat of funding cutbacks, the criticism of parents, and a growing number of troubled children from troubled homes.
177	16	"The Arming of Iraq: Frontline Special"	Middle East	60 minutes	September 11, 1990	817
Hodding Carter investigates the complicity of US and European governments & corporations in creating Saddam Hussein's military machine in Iraq.
The Decade of Destruction documentary
178	17	"The Decade of Destruction Episode One: Ashes of Forest"	Environment	120 minutes	September 18, 1990	818
The series begins with the expansion of peasants into the Amazon, their slashing and burning of the forest land, and the natives' retaliatory actions against one settler's family.
179	18	"The Decade of Destruction Episode Two: Killing for Land"	Environment	60 minutes	September 19, 1990	819
Lawless battles break out between corporate owners of Amazon farmland (who want the land left idle for speculation) and the migrant peasants who farm the plots.
180	19	"The Decade of Destruction Episode Three: Mountains of Gold"	Environment	60 minutes	September 20, 1990	820
Prospectors illegally swarm over private gold reserves in the Amazon, with the government fighting to protect the untapped reserves.
181	20	"The Decade of Destruction Episode Four: Chico Mendes"	Environment	60 minutes	September 21, 1990	821
The rise of Chico Mendes, his unionization of rubber tappers, and his fight to halt the rainforest's devastation and create protective areas.
Special
182	21	"Global Dumping Ground: Frontline Special"	Environment	60 minutes	October 2, 1990	822
Bill Moyers investigates the big business of shipping of toxic waste from the US to third-world countries.
183	22	"When Cops Go Bad"	Criminal justice	60 minutes	October 16, 1990	901
How the corrupting influence of drug money is affecting police forces in California, Florida, and New Jersey.
184	23	"The Hunt for Howard Marks"	Biographies	60 minutes	October 23, 1990	902
The story of Welsh drug smuggler Howard Marks and his capture by DEA agents.
185	24	"Broken Minds"	Health	60 minutes	October 30, 1990	903
A look the science and societal struggles behind schizophrenia, a disease that affects millions of Americans.
186	25	"Betting on the Lottery"	Social issues	60 minutes	November 6, 1990	904
James Reston Jr. looks at the growing popularity of state lotteries in the US.
187	26	"Springfield Goes to War"	Military	60 minutes	November 20, 1990	905
Bill Moyers holds a town meeting with residents of Springfield, Massachusetts grappling with the growing buildup of the Gulf War.
188	27	"High Crimes and Misdemeanors"	Foreign affairs	60 minutes	November 27, 1990	906
Four years after the story broke, Bill Moyers takes a full-view look at the Iran–Contra affair.
189	28	"The Struggle for South Africa"	Race/multicultural	90 minutes	December 11, 1990	907
David Dimbleby examines how fractures between and within Afrikaner and Black groups threatens to disrupt negotiations for a new South Africa.
190	29	"The Spirit of Crazy Horse"	Race/multicultural	60 minutes	December 18, 1990	908
One century after the Wounded Knee Massacre, Milo Yellow Hair recalls the story of his fellow Sioux people, from loss of land to invading whites through the present-day revival of Sioux cultural pride.

=== Season 9 (1991) ===
No. overall	No. in season	Title	Topic(s)	Running time	Original release date	Prod. code
191	9	"To the Brink of War"	Foreign affairs	60 minutes	January 15, 1991	909
On the day a UN resolution for Iraq to withdraw from Kuwait reaches its deadline, Hodding Carter examines US government decisions that brought the nation to the brink of war.
192	10	"Cuba and Cocaine"	War on drugs	60 minutes	February 5, 1991	910
A revelation into how drug smuggling became Cuban state policy.
193	11	"The Man Who Made the Supergun"	Biographies	60 minutes	February 12, 1991	911
A profile of Gerald Bull, a designer of long-range artillery, and the questions surrounding his 1990 assassination.
194	12	"Guns, Tanks, and Gorbachev"	Foreign affairs	60 minutes	February 19, 1991	912
Hedrick Smith looks at recent violent occurrences in the Soviet Union and the ramifications in US/USSR relations.
195	13	"The Mind of Hussein"	Biographies	60 minutes	February 26, 1991	913
The personal and political history of Saddam Hussein.
196	14	"Black America's War"	Gulf War	60 minutes	April 2, 1991	914
Harvard law professor Charles Ogletree leads a town meeting exploring the attitudes of Black Americans toward the Gulf War, a conflict in which nearly 30% of US soldiers were African American.
197	15	"War and Peace in Panama"	Foreign affairs	60 minutes	April 9, 1991	915
A look at the 1989 ousting of Manuel Noriega by US forces and its lingering impact.
198	16	"The Election Held Hostage"	Foreign affairs	60 minutes	April 16, 1991	916
Robert Parry investigates how the Carter and Reagan camps possibly sought deals to end the Iran hostage crisis during the 1980 presidential campaign.
199	17	"Who Pays for Mom and Dad?"	Family/Children	60 minutes	April 30, 1991	917
A look at the financial difficulties families face in seeking long-term care for elderly parents.
200	18	"Innocence Lost"	Family/Children	120 minutes	May 7, 1991	918
How an investigation into sexual abuse accusations at a daycare center divided the town of Edenton, North Carolina.
201	19	"The Spy Hunter"	Biographies	60 minutes	May 14, 1991	919
A look at James Angleton, ex-chief of counter-intelligence for the CIA, and his misguided pursuit of an agency mole.
202	20	"To the Last Fish"	Environment	60 minutes	May 21, 1991	920
How new technologies in the fishing industry are putting the world's fisheries into a dangerous state of decline.
203	21	"The Color of Your Skin"	Race/Multicultural	60 minutes	June 11, 1991	921
A look at a program at the Defense Equal Opportunity Management Institute where students of all races confront each other with their racial anger and frustration.
204	22	"The Gates Nomination"	Foreign affairs	30 minutes	July 15, 1991	922
A profile of Robert Gates looks at the DCI nominee's role in the Iran–Contra affair.
205	1	"In the Shadow of Sakharov"	Biographies	90 minutes	October 15, 1991	1001
The story of Andrei Sakharov, the nuclear physicist turned human-rights advocate who became the father of the Soviet democracy movement.
206	2	"The Great American Bailout"	Financial	60 minutes	October 22, 1991	1002
Robert Krulwich investigates the rising cost of the Savings and loan crisis (A co-production with the Center for Investigative Reporting)
207	3	"The War We Left Behind"	Gulf War	60 minutes	October 29, 1991	1003
How the air war against Iraq led to a "slow-motion disaster" affecting the country's post-war utility infrastructure.
208	4	"Don King, Unauthorized"	Biographies	60 minutes	November 5, 1991	1004
Jack Newfield explores the life and career of boxing promoter Don King.
209	5	"My Doctor, My Lover"	Criminal justice	90 minutes	November 12, 1991	1005
An investigation into the scandal surrounding a Colorado psychiatrist who had an affair with one of his patients, who ended up suing him for sexual abuse.
210	6	"Losing the War with Japan"	Business	90 minutes	November 19, 1991	1006
A look at the challenge Japanese-style capitalism poses to the US market, followed by a Robert Krulwich-led discussion into the issue.
211	7	"The Secret Story of Terry Waite"	Foreign affairs	60 minutes	November 26, 1991	1007
Gavin Hewitt investigates the charge that Oliver North used Terry Waite, a Church of England envoy and recently released Lebanon hostage, to cover up the Iran–Contra affair (A co-production with BBC News)
212	8	"Who Killed Adam Mann?"	Family/Children	60 minutes	December 3, 1991	1008
How New York City's child welfare service failed to protect four children from their abusive parents, who were sent to prison for the beating death of one of the children.

=== Season 10 (1992) ===
No. overall	No. in season	Title	Topic(s)	Running time	Original release date	Prod. code
213	1	"The Resurrection of Reverend Moon"	Biographies	60 minutes	January 21, 1992	1009
A profile of Reverend Sun Myung Moon, who after reemerging from a prison sentence for conspiracy and false tax returns, has become a notable figure in conservative-leaning politics, media, and causes.
214	2	"The Last Communist"	Biographies	60 minutes	February 11, 1992	1010
A look at Cuban leader Fidel Castro from his days as a revolutionary to his defiant leadership in present day.
215	3	"Coming From Japan"	Business/Economy/Financial	60 minutes	February 18, 1992	1011
Shuichi Kato narrates over a controversial 30-year history between Matsushita Electric Company and the U.S. and explores the issues that confronts Japan in its economic expansion.
216	4	"After Gorbachev's USSR"	Culture	60 minutes	February 25, 1992	1012
Hedrick Smith follows up on his 1990 series Inside Gorbachev's USSR by reviewing how post-Soviet Russia is handling newfound freedoms while dealing with financial struggles.
217	5	"Who Is David Duke?"	Biographies	60 minutes	March 3, 1992	1013
Hodding Carter investigates the life of David Duke, his background in extremist ideology, and the reshaping of his image into a national political figure.
218	6	"The Death of Nancy Cruzan"	Health	90 minutes	March 24, 1992	1014
The legal battle by the family of Nancy Cruzan, who was left in a persistent vegetative state after a 1983 auto accident and was the subject of the first right-to-die case heard by the U.S. Supreme Court.
219	7	"Saddam's Killing Fields"	Middle East	60 minutes	March 31, 1992	1015
Kanan Makiya secretly returns to Iraq to investigate rumors of an official extermination program aimed at the Kurdish people.
220	8	"Investigating the October Surprise"	Foreign affairs, politics	60 minutes	April 7, 1992	1016
In this follow-up to Season 9's "The Election Held Hostage", Robert Parry investigates whether Ronald Reagan's campaign manager could have met with Iranian officials in the summer of 1980 regarding a possible end to the hostage crisis.
221	9	"The Betrayal of Democracy"	Politics	120 minutes	April 15, 1992	1017
William Greider examines the widening divide between those in government and the citizens they serve and represent, and how the press and the political parties are failing the public.
222	10	"The Bank of Crooks and Criminals"	Finance, criminal justice	60 minutes	April 21, 1992	1018
How the Bank of Credit and Commerce International became a conduit for laundering money from criminal activities, and how it managed to elude regulatory review by US officials.
223	11	"Who Cares About Children?"	Family/Children	60 minutes	April 28, 1992	1019
A look at Arkansas' child welfare crisis, the struggle to reform the state's system, and whether governor (and presidential candidate) Bill Clinton avoided any effort toward systemic improvements.
224	12	"China After Tiananmen"	China	90 minutes	June 2, 1992	1020
How China is embracing economic reforms and open society even as a firm hold on political dissent remains in place three years after pro-democracy protests were brutally silenced.
225	13	"Dear Frontline"	Viewer interaction, follow-up reports	30 minutes	June 2, 1992	1021
A presentation of viewer responses to and updates on some of Frontline's reportage.
226	14	"A Kid Kills"	Criminal justice; social issues	60 minutes	June 16, 1992	1022
A look at the case of Damien Bynoe, a 15-year-old charged in the shooting deaths of two Boston youngsters; the Boston gang culture; and the passage of juvenile crime laws in Massachusetts.
227	15	"Your Loan Is Denied"	Finance	60 minutes	June 23, 1992	1023
The effects of discriminatory mortgage-lending practices by American financial institutions. (A co-production with the Center for Investigative Reporting)
228	16	"Thomas and Hill: Public Hearing, Private Pain"	Race/Multicultural	60 minutes	October 13, 1992	1101
How the bitter issues surrounding Clarence Thomas's Supreme Court confirmation hearing affected Black America, and how Blacks and whites had little common understanding about the nomination battle.
229	17	"The Politics of Power"	Energy	60 minutes	October 20, 1992	1102
Nick Kotz looks at the issues plaguing America's energy policy and how it remains guided by special interests and dependent on foreign oil. (A co-production with the Center for Investigative Reporting)
230	18	"The Choice 1992"	Biographies	120 minutes	October 21, 1992	1103
Richard Ben Cramer offers profiles of presidential candidates Bill Clinton and George H. W. Bush.
231	19	"The Best Campaign Money Can Buy"	Politics	60 minutes	October 27, 1992	1104
Robert Krulwich looks into the money givers funding the 1992 presidential campaigns and the access and influence they gain as a result. (A co-production with the Center for Investigative Reporting)
232	20	"Monsters Among Us"	Politics	60 minutes	November 10, 1992	1105
Al Austin investigates the efforts of Washington State to prevent epidemics of sexual assault after the arrest of Wesley Allan Dodd.
233	21	"JFK, Hoffa, and The Mob"	Politics	60 minutes	November 17, 1992	1106
Jack Newfield examines mob lawyer Frank Ragano's theories that the mob was behind plots to kill Fidel Castro, John F. Kennedy, and Jimmy Hoffa.
234	22	"In Search of Our Fathers"	Politics	60 minutes	November 24, 1992	1107
Marco Williams documents the story of his seven-year search to learn about who his father was and the circumstances surrounding his birth.

=== Season 11 (1993) ===
No. overall	No. in season	Title	Topic(s)	Running time	Original release date	Prod. code
235	8	"Clinton Takes Over"	Government	60 minutes	January 19, 1993	1108
On the eve of Bill Clinton's inauguration, Hodding Carter offers an inside view of the new president's administration and the policies it will form.
236	9	"Journey to the Occupied Lands"	Middle East	90 minutes	January 26, 1993	1109
Michael Ambrosino explores life in the Israeli-occupied West Bank and Gaza Strip and the territories' role in Arab-Israeli peace talks.
237	10	"What Happened to the Drug War?"	War on drugs	60 minutes	February 2, 1993	1110
How flaws in the US Government's anti-drug defenses have allowed smugglers in Texas to gain the upper hand.
238	11	"The Secret File on J. Edgar Hoover"	Criminal Justice	60 minutes	February 9, 1993	1111
J. Edgar Hoover amassed secret files on prominent Americans during his time as FBI Director, but his own private life left him open to blackmail, which may have led to the mafia going unchecked by the Bureau for decades.
239	12	"The Arming of Saudi Arabia"	Middle East	60 minutes	February 16, 1993	1112
A look into U.S. efforts to strengthen Saudi Arabia's military defenses.
240	13	"Apartheid's Last Stand"	Racial segregation	60 minutes	March 2, 1993	1113
A look into the progresses gained and compromises made in negotiations to peacefully end Apartheid rule in South Africa.
241	14	"Choosing Death: Health Quarterly Special"	Health	120 minutes	March 23, 1993	1114
Roger Mudd anchors a look into the complexities and dilemmas of euthanasia, including issues about the practice in the Netherlands and an in-studio discussion about the euthanasia debate in the U.S. (A co-production of Frontline and Health Quarterly)
242	15	"In Our Children's Food"	Health	60 minutes	March 30, 1993	1115
Bill Moyers reports on U.S. Government failures to certify the safety of agricultural chemicals and why the pesticide industry is the only source of safety data.
243	16	"The Trouble with Baseball"	Sports	60 minutes	April 6, 1993	1116
How the economic power struggle between Major League Baseball's owners and players is putting the sport on the brink of disaster.
244	17	Iran and the Bomb	Middle East	60 minutes	April 13, 1993	1117
How Iran is quietly building an arsenal of biological, chemical, and nuclear weapons.
245	18	"L.A. Is Burning: 5 Reports from a Divided City"	Social issues	90 minutes	April 27, 1993	1118
A look at Los Angeles, one year after the riots, through the eyes of five people who have thought and written about the city from the perspectives of its different communities, races, and classes.
246	19	"Ashes of the Cold War"	Economics	60 minutes	May 4, 1993	1119
How post-Cold War cutbacks in military spending have affected the industries and people whose livelihood was invested in the military-industrial complex.
247	20	"The Health Care Gamble"	Health	60 minutes	May 25, 1993	1120
A look at President Bill Clinton's efforts to transform health care reform from a campaign issue to a social reality. (Produced in association with The Health Quarterly)
248 249	21 22	"Innocence Lost: The Verdict (Parts I-IV)"	Family/Children, criminal justice	60 minutes	July 20, 1993 (Parts I & II; 60 minutes each) July 21, 1993 (Parts III & IV; 60 minutes each)	1121 1122
A follow-up to 1991's Innocence Lost details the Little Rascals day care sexual abuse trial (at which owner Bob Kelly was convicted and sentenced to 12 consecutive life terms) and the lingering issues of dealing with child sexual abuse cases. Parts I & II use previously aired and unaired footage to track the earliest days of the case. Parts III & IV explores testimony of the victims and actions by prosecutors, defense attorneys, and jurors.
250	1	"The Heartbeat of America"	Industry	90 minutes	October 12, 1993	1201
How General Motors went from being the undisputed top carmaker in America to suffering the biggest financial loss in U.S. corporate history. A co-production with the Center for Investigative Reporting)
251	2	"Prisoners of Silence"	Health	60 minutes	October 19, 1993	1202
A look at the controversial practice of facilitated communication to assist those with autism who cannot verbally communicate.
252	3	"Secrets of a Bomb Factory"	Military	60 minutes	October 26, 1993	1203
Why a federal grand jury investigating potential crimes at Colorado's Rocky Flats nuclear weapons plant went public with what they learned while hearing secret testimony in the case. (A co-production with Oregon Public Broadcasting)
253	4	"Showdown in Haiti"	Foreign affairs	60 minutes	November 9, 1993	1204
A look into the diplomatic confrontation between Haiti's military government and a Clinton Administration that wants to restore deposed Haitian president Jean-Bertrand Aristide to power.
254	5	"Who Was Lee Harvey Oswald?"	Biographies	180 minutes	November 16, 1993	1205
An investigative biography exploring the life of Lee Harvey Oswald and whether he was the man responsible for the Kennedy assassination.
255	6	"AIDS, Blood and Politics"	Health	60 minutes	November 30, 1993	1206
How the FDA and American Red Cross failed to safeguard the nation's blood supply from the AIDS virus in the early 1980s, and why some of America's largest blood banks are still not in full compliance with federal regulations on blood safety.
256	7	"Behind the Badge"	Criminal justice	60 minutes	December 14, 1993	1207
Jack Newfield looks at the effects of police brutality and corruption cases on police officers themselves, specifically the rank and file of the New York City Police Department.

=== Season 12 (1994) ===
No. overall	No. in season	Title	Topic(s)	Running time	Original release date	Prod. code
257	8	"A Place for Madness"	Health; mental illness	60 minutes	January 18, 1994	1208
The balance of protecting rights of the mentally ill with safeguarding society from those who are dangerous to themselves and to others.
258	9	"The Diamond Empire"	Business	90 minutes	February 1, 1994	1209
How South Africa's Oppenheimer family helped fuel a cartel that cultivated the scarcity myth — and in turn inflated the monetary value — of the world's diamond supply.
259	10	"Tabloid Truth: The Michael Jackson Story"	Media	60 minutes	February 15, 1994	1210
Richard Ben Cramer looks at "the tabloidization of American television" through its coverage of sexual abuse allegations against Michael Jackson.
260	11	"Red Flag Over Tibet"	Asia	60 minutes	February 22, 1994	1211
Orville Schell chronicles the history and culture of Tibet and the issues surrounding its control by communist China.
261	12	"Sarajevo: The Living and the Dead"	Bosnian War	60 minutes	March 1, 1994	1212
Radovan Tadic captures an intimate portrait of Sarajevans trying to live in the midst of a debilitating and depriving siege.
262	13	"In the Game"	Sports	60 minutes	March 29, 1994	1213
A behind-the-scenes look at the Stanford Cardinal women's basketball team and its quest for a national championship.
263	14	"The Kevorkian File"	Biographies	60 minutes	April 5, 1994	1214
A profile of Jack Kevorkian and the right to die issue he has come to personify.
264	15	"Mandela"	Biographies	60 minutes	April 26, 1994	1215
A look at the rise to political prominence of Nelson Mandela and former wife Winnie Mandela on the eve of South Africa's first post-apartheid elections.
265	16	"The Struggle for Russia"	Russia	120 minutes	May 3, 1994	1216
A look at the economic, political, and social turmoil plaguing Boris Yeltsin's leadership in Russia.
266	17	Romeo and Juliet in Sarajevo	Bosnian War	90 minutes	May 10, 1994	1217
John Zaritsky's documentary of a young Bosnian couple — Serb Boško Brkić and Bosniak Admira Ismić — whose deaths by sniper fire, while trying to cross a bridge into Serb-held territory, led to one of the more widely seen images from the siege of Sarajevo. (A Frontline co-production with Germany's WDR and Canada's CBC and NFB)
267	18	"Public Lands, Private Profits"	Business	60 minutes	May 24, 1994	1218
Robert Krulwich surveys the mining industry's practice of extracting millions of dollars in minerals and precious metals from public lands at no cost to them. (A co-production with the Center for Investigative Reporting)
268	19	"Go Back to Mexico!"	Immigration	60 minutes	June 7, 1994	1219
William Langewiesche looks at how America can sustain an influx of immigrants, as well as its effects on economic, social, and political discourse.
269	20	"The Trouble with Evan"	Family/Children	90 minutes	June 21, 1994	1220
Surveillance cameras record one family's difficulties in trying to reform their 11-year-old son's criminal behavior.
270	1	"School Colors"	Education; social issues	150 minutes	October 18, 1994	1301
The lingering issues of school segregation along racial and ethnic lines — even 4 decades after Brown v. Board of Education — as seen through California's Berkeley High School, whose student body is 38% white and 35% Black. (Produced with the Center for Investigative Reporting)
271	2	"Is This Any Way to Run a Government?"	Government	60 minutes	October 25, 1994	1302
How Congressional power has long stymied bureaucratic reform efforts within the United States Department of Agriculture.
272	3	"Hot Money"	Finance	60 minutes	November 1, 1994	1303
How the practice of moving money to secret, low-regulated off-shore accounts has played a role in the crimes of money laundering, fraud, and tax evasion.
273	4	"How to Steal $500 Million"	Criminal Justice	60 minutes	November 8, 1994	1304
The rapid rise and stunning fall of Phar-Mor, and how president/co-founder Michael "Mickey" Monus and other top executives were able to hide one of the largest corporate frauds in U.S. history from the company's auditors.
274	5	"Hillary's Class"	Biographies	60 minutes	November 15, 1994	1305
The lives of Hillary Clinton and her fellow graduates from the Wellesley College Class of 1969.

=== Season 13 (1995) ===
No. overall	No. in season	Title	Topic(s)	Running time	Original release date	Prod. code
275	6	"The Nicotine War"	Health	60 minutes	January 3, 1995	1306
A look at FDA commissioner David A. Kessler's efforts to regulate the tobacco industry, and how a Republican-controlled Congress may stymie his mission.
276	7	"Does T.V. Kill?"	Media, social issues	90 minutes	January 10, 1995	1307
Al Austin examines how violence on television affects real life.
277	8	"What Happened to Bill Clinton?"	Government	60 minutes	January 31, 1995	1308
A mosaic of perspectives and insights on Bill Clinton and his performance as U.S. President.
278	9	"The Godfather of Cocaine"	Biographies	90 minutes	February 14, 1995	1309
The rise and fall of Pablo Escobar and how he violently amassed a $4 billion fortune through international cocaine smuggling alliances.
279	10	"The Begging Game"	Social issues	60 minutes	February 21, 1995	1310
Deborah Amos explores the lives and backgrounds of New York City panhandlers.
280	11	"Rush Limbaugh's America"	Biographies	60 minutes	February 28, 1995	1311
The rise of Rush Limbaugh and his influence on both his talk radio & TV audiences and conservative politics.
281 282	12 13	"Divided Memories (Parts 1 & 2)"	Health	120 minutes 120 minutes	April 4, 1995 April 11, 1995	1312 1313
Ofra Bikel's 2-part look into the validity of repressed memories in sexual abuse cases. Part 1 examines how memory works and the different kinds of therapies used to help patients remember. Part 2 looks at how remembered abuse has affected families involved and how real memories are distinguished from those that are not true.
283	14	"The Homecoming"	Biographies	60 minutes	April 25, 1995	1314
Two decades after his exile from the USSR, Aleksandr Solzhenitsyn returns to Russia, offering words of advice and courage to the struggling people he meets along the way.
284	15	"When the Bough Breaks"	Family/Children	60 minutes	May 2, 1995	1315
Intimate hidden-camera looks into how young children's behavior is affected by the fraying of the parent/child bond.
285	16	"The Vanishing Father"	Family/Children	60 minutes	May 16, 1995	1316
How living in fatherless households can adversely affect children's behavior no matter the economic status.
286	17	"The Confessions of RosaLee"	Media	60 minutes	May 23, 1995	1317
A look at a Washington, DC woman and the unending loop of crime, prostitution, and addiction surrounding her and her family, and how her Washington Post profile by Leon Dash influenced policymakers and community leaders.
287	18	"Welcome to Happy Valley"	Health	60 minutes	June 6, 1995	1318
A look at Prozac and the controversial practice by one Washington psychologist of prescribing it to all of his patients.
288	19	"Currents of Fear"	Health	60 minutes	June 13, 1995	1319
A look into whether a high incidence of cancer in an Omaha neighborhood is due to an electric substation located there.
289	1	"Waco: The Inside Story"	Criminal justice	60 minutes	October 17, 1995	1401
New Yorker correspondent Peter Boyer probes the political infighting inside the FBI's Waco command center and the Justice Department's Washington offices during the 1993 siege of the Branch Davidian's compound.
290	2	"The Search for Satan"	Health	60 minutes	October 24, 1995	1402
A look into whether professed victims of secret cults and ritual abuse were helped by the psychiatric care they received.
291	3	"High Stakes in Cyberspace"	Technology	60 minutes	October 31, 1995	1403
Robert Krulwich looks into the "land rush" to stake claims in cyberspace and how these changes will affect society.
292	4	"Who's Afraid of Rupert Murdoch?"	Biographies, media	90 minutes	November 7, 1995	1404
A look at Rupert Murdoch's drive to establish the first global telecommunications network, and how his success in media has been dogged by controversy over journalistic standards and political influence.
293	5	"Natasha and the Wolf"	Criminal justice	90 minutes	November 14, 1995	1405
How a Russian gangster and killer charmed and seduced all who crossed his path, including the state prosecutor who aided in his escape from prison.
294	6	"Living on the Edge"	Social Issues	60 minutes	December 12, 1995	1406
Bill Moyers follows up with two Milwaukee families he first profiled in a 1991 documentary who, after suffering layoffs from blue-collar employment, now struggle to provide for their families while working less-secure jobs.

=== Season 14 (1996) ===
No. overall	No. in season	Title	Topic(s)	Running time	Original release date	Prod. code
295 296	7 8	"The Gulf War"	Middle East	120 minutes (both episodes)	January 9, 1996	1407 (Part 1) 1408 (Part 2)
Five years after Operation Desert Storm, a look into the diplomatic maneuvering and military assaults in the Gulf War, as well as the post-war rebellion inside Iraq.
297	9	"The Long March of Newt Gingrich"	Biographies	60 minutes	January 16, 1996	1409
Peter J. Boyer offers an investigative biography of House Speaker Newt Gingrich, from his childhood roots through his years of ambition and his becoming the face of the Republican Revolution.
298	10	"So You Want to Buy a President?"	Politics	90 minutes	January 30, 1996	1410
Robert Krulwich looks into the expected flow of cash into the 1996 presidential campaigns and the interests of those who donate the money.
299	11	"Murder on 'Abortion Row'"	Criminal justice	120 minutes	February 6, 1996	1411
A look into what led abortion opponent John Salvi to carry out fatal shootings at two reproductive health clinics in Brookline, Massachusetts in 1994.
300	12	"Breast Implants on Trial"	Health	90 minutes	February 27, 1996	1412
An examination of the medical and legal issues surrounding silicone breast implants.
301	13	"Smoke in the Eye"	Media	60 minutes	April 2, 1996	1413
A look into the internal corporate and journalistic conflicts news organizations deal with in covering big business, centering on the legal battles surrounding ABC and CBS reports on the tobacco industry. (A co-production with CBC Television's the fifth estate)
302	14	"Angel on Death Row"	Biographies	60 minutes	April 9, 1996	1414
A profile of Sister Helen Prejean, her role as spiritual advisor to death row inmates, and her crusade against the death penalty.
303	15	Shtetl	Multicultural	180 minutes	April 17, 1996	1320
Marian Marzynski travels to Brańsk, a Polish town struggling to reconcile with its anti-Semitic World War II-era past.
304	16	"The Pilgrimage of Jesse Jackson"	Biographies	90 minutes	April 30, 1996	1415
An in-depth look at civil rights leader Jesse Jackson and a portrait of race and politics in post-World War II America.
305	17	"The Kevorkian Verdict"	Health	60 minutes	May 14, 1996	1416
The saga of Jack Kevorkian and his role in how America thinks physician-assisted suicides about end-of-life issues.
306	18	"Does America Still Work?"	Business	60 minutes	May 21, 1996	1417
Jeff Madrick looks behind the political rhetoric to see how companies, workers, and civic leaders are wrestling with global competition and the end of an era of industrial affluence.
307	19	"The Gate of Heavenly Peace"	Foreign Affairs	150 minutes	June 4, 1996	1418
A meticulous chronology of the Tiananmen Square protests of 1989 and a contextual history of China's protest movement.
308	1	"The Choice '96"	Biographies	120 minutes	October 8, 1996	1501
Profiles of presidential candidates Bill Clinton and Bob Dole.
309	2	"Navy Blues"	Military	60 minutes	October 15, 1996	1502
The effects of the Tailhook scandal on the U.S. Navy and the controversy over the introduction of women into combat roles and positions of greater military authority.
310	3	"Why America Hates the Press"	Media	60 minutes	October 22, 1996	1503
With public respect for the press at an all-time low, several notable journalists take a self-examination into the dynamics of the news business and its effect on American politics.
311	4	"Loose Nukes"	Foreign affairs	60 minutes	November 19, 1996	1504
How weapons-grade plutonium and uranium in the former Soviet Union has become vulnerable to theft.
312	5	"Secret Daughter"	Biographies	150 minutes	November 26, 1996	1505
Frontline producer June Cross tells her story as the daughter of a white mother and an African-American father (vaudevillian Jimmy Cross), and how her mother kept June and her parentage a secret to protect the career of June's white stepfather (actor Larry Storch).

=== Season 15 (1997) ===
No. overall	No. in season	Title	Topic(s)	Running time	Original release date	Prod. code
313	6	"Betting on the Market"	Business/finance	60 minutes	January 14, 1997	1506
A look at the seduction of investing in the stock market and its implications on Americans' finances.
314	7	"Six O'Clock News"	Media	90 minutes	January 21, 1997	1507
Ross McElwee looks at the "nagging metaphysical questions" behind life-shattering events — the type covered (sometimes in graphic fashion) by TV news — and the individuals who lives were altered by the incidents.
315	8	"What Jennifer Saw"	Criminal justice	60 minutes	February 25, 1997	1508
Jennifer Thompson recounts her brutal 1984 rape and how she has dealt with the exoneration, thanks to DNA evidence, of the man she mistakenly accused of the crime.
316	9	"Valentina's Nightmare"	Africa	60 minutes	April 1, 1997	1509
A profile of the Rwandan genocide and its aftermath centers on a 13-year-old Tutsi girl and her struggle for survival after a machete attack.
317	10	"Murder, Money, and Mexico"	Latin America	60 minutes	April 8, 1997	1510
How Mexico's monetary crisis was precipitated by corruption during the sexenio of former president Carlos Salinas de Gortari.
318	11	"The Fixers"	Biographies	60 minutes	April 15, 1997	1511
How a husband-and-wife team parlayed a handful of political contributions into millions in personal wealth — and multiple visits to the White House.
319	12	"Nuclear Reaction"	Energy	60 minutes	April 22, 1997	1512
Richard Rhodes looks at how the general public's aversion toward nuclear power has derailed its progress as a vital energy source.
320	13	"Little Criminals"	Criminal justice	60 minutes	May 13, 1997	1513
A look at violent crimes committed by young children centers on a Richmond, California case in which a 6-year-old badly beat an infant neighbor while stealing a tricycle from the infant's home.
321	14	"The Opium Kings"	War on drugs	60 minutes	May 20, 1997	1514
Adrian Cowell looks at the international heroin business, centering on the case of Shan warlord Khun Sa.
322	15	"Innocence Lost: The Plea"	Criminal justice	120 minutes	May 27, 1997	1515
Ofra Bikel revisits the Little Rascals day care sexual abuse trial (a subject of Frontline episodes in Seasons 9 & 11), focusing on the fates of the defendants and those who were encouraged to take plea deals from prosecutors.
323	16	"Hot Guns"	Criminal justice	60 minutes	June 3, 1997	1516
Frontline and the Center for Investigative Reporting look into the market of illegal, unregistered, and stolen firearms.
324	17	"Easy Money"	Business	60 minutes	June 10, 1997	1517
How casino gambling has emerged to become a popular (and legalized) form of adult entertainment.
325	18	"Nazi Gold"	World War II	60 minutes	June 17, 1997	1518
A look at Switzerland's wartime support of Nazi Germany, including its work to replenish Nazi military supplies, its barring of Jewish refugees, and the disappearance of Jewish savings from Swiss banks. (A co-production with BBC)
326	1	"Once Upon a Time in Arkansas"	Government/politics	60 minutes	October 7, 1997	1601
Peter Boyer looks into the deals and relationships at the heart of the Whitewater scandal surrounding First Couple Bill and Hillary Clinton.
327	2	"The Lost American"	Biographies	90 minutes	October 14, 1997	1602
The mysterious disappearance of Fred Cuny, a maverick humanitarian aid expert who helped millions and fought to change how the world responds to disaster.
328	3	"Behind the Mask: The IRA and Sinn Fein"	Biographies	120 minutes	October 21, 1997	1603
The secret history of the Irish Republican Army (IRA) and its equally formidable political arm, Sinn Féin, which have waged a bloody campaign in Northern Ireland for over a quarter of a century.
329	4	"Dreams of Tibet"	Asia	60 minutes	October 28, 1997	1604
Orville Schell explores the clash of values between American opinion of China's human rights record (shaped by powerful forces in Hollywood) and an uncomprehending and intransigent Chinese leadership.
330	5	"A Whale of a Business"	Business; environment	60 minutes	November 11, 1997	1605
A look at America's marine theme park business and the treatment of marine mammals, centering on the plight of the orca whale Keiko.
331	6	"The Princess and the Press"	Media	90 minutes	November 18, 1997	1606
How the British royal family's relationship with the British press, once governed by unwritten rules of privacy, evolved into the media circus that surrounded Princess Diana in her final years.

=== Season 16 (1998) ===
No. overall	No. in season	Title	Topic(s)	Running time	Original release date	Prod. code
332	7	"Last Battle of the Gulf War"	Health	60 minutes	January 20, 1998	1607
A definitive account of what's behind the bitter Gulf War Syndrome controversy, as well as the broad scope of veterans affairs and the psychology of war.
333	8	"My Retirement Dreams"	Social issues	60 minutes	February 3, 1998	1608
Marian Marzynski takes a personal journal into how older Americans adjust into their retirement years.
334	9	"The Two Nations of Black America"	Social issues	60 minutes	February 10, 1998	1609
Henry Louis Gates Jr. asks why America has "both the highest Black middle class and the largest underclass in our history."
335 336	10 11	"From Jesus to Christ: The First Christians"	Religion	151 minutes 153 minutes	April 6, 1998	1610, 1611 1612, 1613
Biblical scholars recount the rise of Christianity within the Roman Empire, the rift between Christians and Jews, and the evolution of the Jesus Movement into the Christian Movement. Hour 1 profiles how Judaism and the Roman empire shaped Jesus' life. Hour 2 traces the beginnings of the Jesus Movement as a sect within Judaism. Hour 3 follows the story of the first attempts to write the life of Jesus--the Gospels. Hour 4 chronicles how the Christian movement became separate from Judaism.
337	13	"The High Price of Health"	Health	60 minutes	April 14, 1998	1614
Hospitals in California and Massachusetts are at the center of this report on the transformation of health care into a profit-driven enterprise.
338	14	"Busted: America's War on Marijuana"	War on drugs	60 minutes	April 28, 1998	1615
A look into the effect of government and law enforcement efforts to stem the tide of marijuana use.
339	15	"Inside the Tobacco Deal"	Biographies	60 minutes	May 12, 1998	1616
Lowell Bergman looks at how two Mississippi lawyers took Big Tobacco to the edge of bankruptcy and criminal prosecution.
340	16	"Secrets of an Independent Counsel"	Government	60 minutes	May 19, 1998	1617
Donald Smaltz takes viewers inside his investigation of former Agriculture Secretary Mike Espy, while correspondent Peter Boyer examines how independent counsels such as Smaltz work and how far they'll go to get what they want.
341	17	"The World's Most Wanted Man"	Biographies	90 minutes	May 26, 1998	1618
The hunt for indicted Serbian war leader Radovan Karadzic, and his role in the atrocities and genocide of the Bosnian War.
342	18	"Fooling With Nature"	Health; environment	60 minutes	June 2, 1998	1619
A look at new evidence in the controversy over how dangerous man-made chemicals are to human health and the environment.
343 344 345	1 2 3	The Farmer's Wife	Family; farming	120 minutes 120 minutes 150 minutes	September 21, 1998 September 22, 1998 September 23, 1998	1701 1702 1703
David Sutherland's 3-part profile of a Nebraska farm couple and their struggles to keep their farm and marriage afloat. (A co-production of David Sutherland Productions and Frontline in association with the Independent Television Service)
346	4	"Ambush in Mogadishu"	Foreign affairs, military	90 minutes	September 29, 1998	1704
How a 1993 peacekeeping mission in Somalia involving U.S. special forces went awry, and how it influences current U.S. special forces operations in Afghanistan.
347	5	"Washington's Other Scandal"	Campaign finance	60 minutes	October 6, 1998	1705
A special report by Bill Moyers on the 1996 election campaign, showing how both political parties contrived to bend and break laws regulating campaign donations to their own benefit.
348	6	"Plague War"	Science, warfare	60 minutes	October 13, 1998	1706
A report on the threat of biological weapons, how the Soviet Union secretly amassed an arsenal of such weapons, and how U.S. officials and scientists are racing to find a defense against their use.
349	7	"The Child Terror"	Criminal justice	60 minutes	October 27, 1998	1707
Peter Boyer looks at Janet Reno's zeal in investigating and prosecuting cases of child sexual abuse, a model that prosecutors across the country would emulate.
350	8	"Fat"	Health	60 minutes	November 3, 1998	1708
How modern life, biology, genetics, media, and the diet industry influence our relationship with food and the war against obesity.

=== Season 17 (1999) ===
No. overall	No. in season	Title	Topic(s)	Running time	Original release date	Prod. code
351	9	"Snitch"	Criminal justice	90 minutes	January 12, 1999	1709
The impact of prosecutors' use of informants in prosecuting drug crimes.
352	10	"Rwanda: The Triumph of Evil"	Africa	60 minutes	January 26, 1999	1710
How the U.S. and the U.N. ignored the warning signs of the impending Rwandan genocide.
353	11	"The Execution"	Criminal justice	90 minutes	February 9, 1999	1711
3 year journalistic analysis of the life, crimes, impact and execution of Clifford Boggess, who was put to death in June 1998, by the State of Texas for two robbery/murders committed in 1986.
354	12	"Russian Roulette"	Defense	60 minutes	February 23, 1999	1712
An investigation into the safety and security of the Russian nuclear arsenal and the potential for accidental launch or diversion of its nuclear weapons.
355	13	"Hunting Bin Laden"	War on terror	60 minutes	April 13, 1999	1713
A look at Osama bin Laden, his terror network, and his role in terrorist attacks against American interests.
356	14	"Spying on Saddam"	Foreign affairs	60 minutes	April 27, 1999	1714
A look into allegations that UNSCOM, a U.N. commission created to find and destroy weapons of mass destruction in Iraq, was turned by the U.S. into a spy agency against Saddam Hussein.
357	15	"Give War a Chance"	Defense	60 minutes	May 11, 1999	1715
Examining the gulf between what civilian diplomats want and what the military is prepared to deliver.
358	16	"The Long Walk of Nelson Mandela"	Biographies	120 minutes	May 25, 1999	1716
An in-depth profile of Nelson Mandela.
359	17	"Making Babies"	Health	60 minutes	June 1, 1999	1717
The revolution in the science of reproduction and the troubling questions it's raising.
360	18	"Pop"	Biographies	60 minutes	June 22, 1999	1718
Joel Meyerowitz and his son go on a trip with Joel's 87-year-old father, Hy Meyerowitz, who still offers wit and wisdom despite the ravages of Alzheimer's disease.
361	19	"The Crash"	Business/Economy/Financial	60 minutes	June 29, 1999	1719
How a real estate bust in Thailand led to the 1997 Asian financial crisis that would ultimately have a worldwide effect.
362	1	"John Paul II: The Millennial Pope"	Biographies	150 minutes	September 28, 1999	1801
A comprehensive biography of John Paul II.
363	2	"Secrets of the SAT"	Education	60 minutes	October 5, 1999	1802
A look at the obsession over standardized tests, the test scores they produce, and their impact on the college admission process and American education in general.
364	3	"Mafia Power Play"	Criminal justice, sports	60 minutes	October 12, 1999	1803
An investigation into how Russian organized crime figures are extorting Russian-born National Hockey League players and using those connections to establish a criminal presence in North America.
365	4	"The Lost Children of Rockdale County"	Social Issues, family/children, health	90 minutes	October 19, 1999	1804
A series of profiles uncovers the overindulging roots of a 1996 outbreak of syphilis among teenagers in the affluent community of Conyers, Georgia.
366 367	5 6	"Apocalypse"	Religion	120 minutes	November 22, 1999	1805 (Hour 1) 1806 (Hour 2)
An examination of apocalyptic beliefs over 2500 years of western cultural history.
368	7	"Justice for Sale"	Politics, jurisprudence, finance	60 minutes	November 23, 1999	1807
Bill Moyers investigates the influence of campaign contributions in the judicial election process and how they may be corrupting the court system. The hour his highlighted by Moyers' interview with U.S. Supreme Court justices Anthony Kennedy and Stephen Breyer, who voice their concerns about the monetary campaign system in judicial races.

=== Season 18 (2000) ===
No. overall	No. in season	Title	Topic(s)	Running time	Original release date	Prod. code
369	8	"The Case for Innocence"	Science, criminal justice	90 minutes	January 11, 2000	1808
A look into DNA testing in criminal cases and the reluctance of legal & judicial figures and governors to employ such testing — which has led those convicted of rape & murder yet proven innocent through testing to remain imprisoned.
370	9	"The Killer at Thurston High"	TBA	90 minutes	January 18, 2000	1809
The troubled life of Kipland 'Kip' Kinkel, a 15-year-old Oregon high school student who, in a May 1998 incident, killed both of his parents and then killed 2 classmates and wounded 25 others at his high school.
371	10	"The Survival of Saddam"	Biographies	60 minutes	January 25, 2000	1810
A look at Saddam Hussein's rise to power and how he has maintained his grip despite opposition from within and outside Iraq.
372	11	"Assault on Gay America"	Social issues	60 minutes	February 15, 2000	1811
Forrest Sawyer explores homophobia's permeation into American society and how it became a catalyst for hate crimes directed at the LGBT community.
373 374	12 13	"War in Europe"	Foreign Affairs, Defense/Military	120 minutes	February 22, 2000	1812 (Hour 1) 1813 (Hour 2)
Peter Boyer examines the political constraints, internal divisions and miscalculations that shaped in NATO's war against Serbia over the Kosovo region. The broadcast highlighted by an in-depth interview with Wesley Clark, who led the war as NATO's supreme allied commander in Europe.
375	14	"Dr. Solomon's Dilemma"	Health	60 minutes	April 4, 2000	1814
Hedrick Smith profiles the struggle of one Boston doctor and his colleagues over balancing patient care with resulting financial constraints.
376	15	"What's Up with the Weather?"	Science, environment/climate	120 minutes	April 18, 2000	GLWA000K
A look at the impact of global warming, the political struggle between environmentalists and industrialists, the tentative balance of reducing greenhouse gases with the needs of a technologically-based 21st century world economy. (A co-production of Frontline and NOVA)
377	15	"Jefferson's Blood"	Biographies, racial issues	90 minutes	May 2, 2000	1815
Shelby Steele examines Thomas Jefferson's relationship with his slave and mistress Sally Hemings, and follows their descendants as they undergo DNA testing to verify their ancestry.
378	16	"Return of the Czar"	Foreign relations	60 minutes	May 9, 2000	1816
An in-depth look at Russia, almost decade after the fall of the Soviet Union, finds a country becoming more militarized and influenced by anti-Western propaganda — just as Vladimir Putin is set to ascend to the Russian presidency.
379	17	"The Battle Over School Choice"	Education	60 minutes	May 23, 2000	1817
An investigation of the political and educational clash over charter schools, voucher programs, and school choice options, as well as the allure of for-profit inner-city academies.
380	1	"The Choice 2000"	Biographies	120 minutes	October 2, 2000	1901
Biographies on presidential candidates George W. Bush and Al Gore.
381 382	2 3	"Drug Wars"	War on drugs, history	120 minutes 120 minutes	October 9, 2000 October 10, 2000	1902 1903
A 2-part history of America's war on drugs as told from both sides of the battlefield. Part 1 spans the origins of the anti-drug campaign to the rise & fall of Columbia's drug cartels. Part 2 examines the impact of both the crack cocaine epidemic and Mexico's role in supplying drugs to meet American demand.
383	4	"The Future of War"	Military	60 minutes	October 24, 2000	1904
A look at the U.S. Army's internal debate over evolving from a Cold War force to one ready for 21st century conflicts.
384 385	5 6	"Real Justice (Parts 1 & 2)"	Criminal justice	90 minutes 90 minutes	November 14, 2000 November 21, 2000	1905 1906
A 2-part warts-and-all look inside the halls of the Suffolk County, Massachusetts court system (District Court in Part 1, Superior Court in Part 2)

=== Season 19 (2001) ===
No. overall	No. in season	Title	Topic(s)	Running time	Original release date	Prod. code
386	7	"The Clinton Years"	Biographies	120 minutes	January 16, 2001	1907
A look at Bill Clinton's life from the Arkansas governor's mansion through a hard-fought presidential campaign and his eight years in the White House. (A co-production of Frontline and ABC News' Nightline)
387	8	"Juvenile Justice"	Criminal justice	90 minutes	January 30, 2001	1908
An observation of how Santa Clara County, California's juvenile court system prosecutes crimes against a quartet of young offenders (1 white, 2 Hispanic, 1 African American) who have committed violent crimes.
388	9	"Saving Elian"	Foreign relations, family/children, immigration	60 minutes	February 6, 2001	1909
Ofra Bikel examines how Elián González became a symbol in the struggle for freedom from Cuban communist oppression that has long enveloped Miami's Cuban-American community.
389	10	"Hackers"	Criminal justice, technology	60 minutes	February 13, 2001	1910
A report on the exploits of hackers and how their actions have highlighted the Internet's insecurities.
390	11	"The Merchants of Cool"	Business/Economy/Financial	60 minutes	February 27, 2001	1911
Douglas Rushkoff examines the techniques businesses and marketers use to cater to the teenage consumer demographic, as well as the resulting cultural ramifications.
391 392	12 13	"Organ Farm"	Science, health/medical	60 minutes	March 27, 2001 April 3, 2001	1912 1913
A 2-part look at xenotransplantation, the experimental process of transplanting genetically modified cells and organs into humans, and the possible benefits and medical risks that may result.
393	14	"Medicating Kids"	Health/Medical	60 minutes	April 10, 2001	1914
An intimate look into the growing use of prescribing behavior-modifying drugs (e.g. Ritalin, Prozac, Adderall) to children, and whether the practice is medically necessary or just a quick fix.
394	15	"Harvest of Fear"	Science	120 minutes	April 24, 2001	1915
A look into the practice of genetically modifying food crops, and whether its potential is a boon or a threat to mankind. (A co-production of Frontline and NOVA)
395	16	"LAPD Blues"	Criminal justice	60 minutes	May 15, 2001	1916
Peter J. Boyer looks at the reports of police brutality, racism, and corruption surrounding the Los Angeles Police Department.
396	17	"Blackout"	Business, infrastructure	60 minutes	June 5, 2001	1917
A look into whether the California electricity crisis was caused by high demand, flawed deregulation, or market manipulation by entrepreneurs in the power utility business.
397	1	"Hunting Bin Laden"	War on terror	60 minutes	September 13, 2001	1713A
Airing two days after the September 11 attacks, this updated version of a Season 17 report retraces the evidence linking Osama bin Laden and his terror network to 9/11 and other attacks against American interests.
398	2	"Target America"	War on terror	60 minutes	October 4, 2001	2001
A look at a decades-long division within America's security apparatus over how to deal with Islamic militants.
399	3	"Looking for Answers"	War on terror	60 minutes	October 9, 2001	2002
Bill Moyers anchors this investigation, led by Lowell Bergman, into why the CIA and FBI failed to uncover the 9/11 hijackers, as well as the U.S. government's failure to fully understand the hatred Muslim fundamentalists have for America and its interests. (Produced in partnership with The New York Times)
400	4	"Dangerous Straits"	Foreign relations	60 minutes	October 18, 2001	2003
A look into the troubled diplomatic relations between the United States and China, and how issues over Taiwan and China's support of some Islamic states have fostered the strain. (Produced in partnership with The New York Times)
401	5	"Trail of a Terrorist"	War on terror	60 minutes	October 25, 2001	2004
Terence McKenna looks at Ahmed Ressam's trail from North Africa to Canada to an averted attempt to blow up a Los Angeles airport terminal in December 1999. (A co-production with the Canadian Broadcasting Corporation)
402	6	"Gunning for Saddam"	Middle East, war on terror	60 minutes	November 8, 2001	2005
A look at the debate within the U.S. government over how to deal with Saddam Hussein over the Iraqi leader's state sponsorship of terrorist activities.
403	7	"Saudi Time Bomb?"	The Middle East & the war on terror	60 minutes	November 15, 2001	2006
An exploration into America's fragile post-9/11 ties with Saudi Arabia and whether support within the kingdom toward Islamic fundamentalism threatens the stability of their relationship and the Middle East. (Produced in partnership with The New York Times)
404	8	"The Monster That Ate Hollywood"	Arts/Entertainment	60 minutes	November 22, 2001	2007
How multinational conglomerates, profit-minded studio executives, and a yearning to make blockbuster films have changed Hollywood's motion picture industry.

=== Season 20 (2002) ===
No. overall	No. in season	Title	Topic(s)	Running time	Original release date	Prod. code
405	9	"An Ordinary Crime"	Criminal justice	90 minutes	January 10, 2002	2008
An investigation into a bizarre case of injustice: Terence Garner is implicated, convicted, and sentenced for his role in a robbery and attempted murder, despite sharing only the first name as the man the lead suspect in the crime implicated.
406	10	"Inside the Terror Network"	War on terror	60 minutes	January 17, 2002	2009
How the hijackers involved in the September 11 attacks led such outwardly ordinary lives and constructed their plot in seemingly broad daylight.
407	11	"Dot Con"	Business	60 minutes	January 24, 2002	2010
A look into the financial forces behind the unprecedented rise and seemingly overnight fall of the Internet economy.
408	12	"Inside the Teenage Brain"	Health	60 minutes	January 31, 2002	2011
How science may help to explain why adolescents behave the way they do, and how it may lead to changes in how we parent, teach, or understand teenagers.
409	13	"American Porn"	Arts/entertainment	60 minutes	February 7, 2002	2012
A look at the business of the pornography industry and the emerging political battle against it.
410	14	"Rollover: The Hidden History of the SUV"	Transportation	60 minutes	February 21, 2002	2013
How Detroit's connections with Washington regulators may have led to the popularity of sport utility vehicles, despite safety concerns.
411	15	"Testing Our Schools"	Education	60 minutes	March 28, 2002	2014
John Merrow examines how a business-like quest for higher test scores is changing teaching and learning in America.
412	16	"Battle for the Holy Land"	Middle East	60 minutes	April 11, 2002	2015
A look into how the Israeli/Palestinian conflict has evolved from sticks & stones into an all-out combat involving commando units, militants, target killings, and suicide bombings.
413	17	"Requiem for Frank Lee Smith"	Criminal justice	60 minutes	April 11, 2002	2016
How a man convicted of rape & murder remained on Florida's death row, despite possible evidence of innocence, and why he wasn't exonerated until 10 months after his death from cancer.
414	18	"Modern Meat"	Health	60 minutes	April 18, 2002	2017
How the meat production industry has become highly mechanizes, and how the industry has gained great control of the meat inspection process.
415	19	"Did Daddy Do It?"	Criminal justice	60 minutes	April 25, 2002	2018
A Frontline investigation calls into question the seemingly ironclad case against a Cuban immigrant convicted of sexually abusing numerous children at his family's day care service in Miami.
416	20	"Terror and Tehran"	Middle East	60 minutes	May 2, 2002	2019
A look into the terror threat from Iran and whether U.S. actions against the country help or hinder moderates' struggle to reform the country's hard-line conservative government.
417	21	"Muslims"	Religion	120 minutes	May 9, 2002	2020
A look at the beliefs, identities, perspectives, and tensions that shape the practice of the Muslim religion in the modern world.
418	22	"The Siege of Bethlehem"	Middle East	60 minutes	June 13, 2002	2021
A look at the siege of Bethlehem's Church of the Nativity, in which Palestinian militants sought refuge from Israel Defense Forces.
419	23	"Bigger Than Enron"	Business	60 minutes	June 20, 2002	2022
How market deregulation, an oversight system gone soft, and conflicts of interest between accounts and the companies they were auditing allowed the scandal that engulfed Enron to go unchecked — and why that company's downfall might be only the tip of the iceberg.
420	24	"Shattered Dreams to Peace: The Road from Oslo"	Middle East	120 minutes	June 27, 2002	2023
A look into the quest for Middle East peace that began with the Oslo Accords was endlessly threatened, and ultimately undone, by the dynamics of politics and violence on both sides.
421	1	"Faith and Doubt at Ground Zero"	Religion, psychology	120 minutes	September 3, 2002	2101
An exploration of the various spiritual questions awoken by the September 11 attacks.
422	2	"Campaign Against Terror"	War on terror, military	120 minutes	September 8, 2002	2102
The behind-the-scenes story of the U.S. and global response to the September 11 attacks and the war in Afghanistan.
423	3	"The Man Who Knew"	Biographies, war on terror	90 minutes	October 3, 2002	2103
The story of FBI agent John P. O'Neill, an FBI counter-terrorism expert whose warnings about al Qaeda fell generally on deaf ears. Pressured to leave the bureau, he became security director for the World Trade Center, where he died during the September 11 attacks.
424	4	"Missile Wars"	Military	60 minutes	October 10, 2002	2104
A look at the issue of missile defense of the U.S. and how it fits into American military strategy after 9/11.
425	5	"A Crime of Insanity"	Criminal justice, health	60 minutes	October 17, 2002	2105
An examination of the personal, political, and societal fallout from the colliding of the legal and psychiatric worlds, centering on the 1994 story of a paranoid schizophrenic who held a college classroom hostage.
426	6	"Let's Get Married"	Family/children	60 minutes	November 14, 2002	2106
Alex Kotlowitz explores the decreasing prominence of marriage and whether government should have a role in strengthening the institution.
427	7	"In Search of Al Qaeda"	Afghanistan/Pakistan	60 minutes	November 21, 2002	2107
How, despite American forces crushing the Taliban in Afghanistan, members of the Al Qaeda network managed to escape out of Afghanistan.

=== Season 21 (2003) ===
No. overall	No. in season	Title	Topic(s)	Running time	Original release date	Prod. code
428	8	"Much Ado About Something"	Arts/entertainment	90 minutes	January 2, 2003	2108
A look into whether Christopher Marlowe was the actual writer of plays and poems long credited to William Shakespeare.
429	9	"A Dangerous Business"	Business/Economy/Financial	60 minutes	January 9, 2003	2109
An investigation into whether McWane Inc. prioritized the production and profitability of its iron ore foundries ahead of worker and environmental safety. (A joint investigation of Frontline, The New York Times, and the Canadian Broadcasting Corporation)
430	10	"Failure to Protect: The Taking of Logan Marr"	Family/Children	60 minutes	January 30, 2003	2110
A probe into the death of a 5-year-old girl in foster care in Maine examines what led to her decline in well being and whether she should have been placed in foster care in the first place.
431	11	"Failure to Protect: The Caseworker Files"	Family/Children	120 minutes	February 6, 2003	2111
A companion to "The Taking of Logan Marr", Hour 1 of this episode follows the work of a group of foster care caseworkers. Hour 2 is a town hall-style discussion on child welfare policy.
432	12	"China in the Red"	Foreign Affairs/Defense/Military	120 minutes	February 13, 2003	2112
This documentary chronicles 3 years in the lives and struggles of Chinese citizens caught up in the country's social and economic transformation.
433	13	"The War Behind Closed Doors"	Middle East, war on terror	60 minutes	February 20, 2003	2113
An investigation into the Bush administration's desire to go to war with Iraq and whether the publicly stated reasons (e.g. fear of weapons of mass destruction) are masking the real reasons for war.
434	14	"The Long Road to War"	Middle East, war on terror	120 minutes	March 17, 2003	0000
This special report draws on Frontline's previous reportage on Iraq to examine the conflict between the U.S. and Saddam Hussein that has led to the brink of war.
435	15	"Blair's War"	Foreign relations, war on terror	60 minutes	April 3, 2003	2114
An examination of Prime Minister Tony Blair's role in support of the Iraq War (despite strong opposition in the United Kingdom) and how it has laid bare the strain of relations between the U.S. and its western allies.
436	16	"Kim's Nuclear Gamble"	Foreign Affairs/Defense/Military	60 minutes	April 10, 2003	2115
A look at the unstable relationship between the U.S. and North Korea and how the world has wound up on the brink of a nuclear showdown with the "Hermit Kingdom".
437	17	"Cyber War!"	Science & Technology, counter-terrorism	60 minutes	April 24, 2003	2116
How the U.S. infrastructure faces real vulnerability in a new battleground — cyberspace.
438	18	"Burden of Innocence"	Criminal Justice	60 minutes	May 1, 2003	2117
Profiles of recently released inmates who, despite receiving full exoneration for crimes they did not commit, do not receive any financial compensation or transitional assistance from the states that wrongfully imprisoned them.
439	19	"The Wall Street Fix"	Business/Economy, Financial Crisis	60 minutes	May 8, 2003	2118
Hedrick Smith looks at the hidden ties that enabled big banks and Wall Street insiders to profit while leaving ordinary investors holding worthless stock.
440	20	"The Other Drug War"	Health/Medical	60 minutes	June 19, 2003	2120
Examining the battle between states and the pharmaceutical industry over the high cost of prescription drugs.
441	21	"Public Schools, Inc."	Education	60 minutes	July 3, 2003	2119
A look into "edupreneur" Chris Whittle and his Edison Schools, and whether it's possible to run better public schools that also turn a profit. (A joint investigation by Frontline, The NewsHour's "Merrow Report", and The New York Times)
442	1	"Truth, War, and Consequences"	Middle East	90 minutes	October 9, 2003	2201
Martin Smith examines the justification for America's war in Iraq, what went wrong in post-war planning, and what's at stake for both countries.
443	2	"Chasing the Sleeper Cell"	War on terror	60 minutes	October 16, 2003	2202
A look at the Lackawanna Six, whether they were an Al Qaeda sleeper cell (as government officials claimed), and whether the powers the FBI and CIA have been granted by the Patriot Act have any effectiveness.
444	3	"The Alternative Fix"	Health/Medical	60 minutes	November 6, 2003	2203
The embrace and business of and questionable science behind alternative medicine is examined.
445	4	"Dangerous Prescription"	Health/Medical	60 minutes	November 13, 2003	2204
A look at the integrity of America's drug safety system, the influence of pharmaceutical companies on the FDA's drug approval process, and whether that process is adequate in protecting the American public.
446	5	"Who Was Lee Harvey Oswald?"	Biographies	180 minutes	November 20, 2003	1205
Coinciding with the 40th anniversary week of the Kennedy assassination, this encore of a 1993 episode explores the life of Lee Harvey Oswald and whether he was the man responsible for killing Kennedy.

=== Season 22 (2004) ===
No. overall	No. in season	Title	Topic(s)	Running time	Original release date	Prod. code
447	6	"From China with Love"	Foreign affairs, counter-intelligence	60 minutes	January 15, 2004	2205
The story of Katrina Leung, an FBI asset (code named "Parlor Maid") who, the U.S. government alleges, conspired with her FBI handler and lover, Special Agent James J. Smith, compromised American intelligence on behalf of China's Ministry of State Security.
448	7	"Chasing Saddam's Weapons"	War on terror	60 minutes	January 22, 2004	2206
BBC reporter Jane Corbin looks at the high-stakes hunt for Saddam Hussein's weapons of mass destruction and whether the ultimate results will justify the Bush administration's call for war. (A BBC production in association with Frontline)
449	8	"Beyond Baghdad"	Middle East	60 minutes	February 12, 2004	2207
Martin Smith journeys the length and breadth of Iraq to examine what it will take to stabilize the fractured country, establish democracy, and transfer power to its people.
450	9	"Tax Me if You Can"	Business/Economy	60 minutes	February 19, 2004	2208
Hedrick Smith looks at the use of tax shelters by corporations and wealthy individuals, the role of accounting firms in these deals, and how ordinary taxpayers wind up footing the bill.
451	10	"The Invasion of Iraq"	Middle East	120 minutes	March 9, 2004	2209
A look at the strategies, key battles, surprises, and turning points of the Operation Iraqi Freedom. (A Mentorn production for Frontline and Channel 4)
452	11	"Ghosts of Rwanda"	Foreign affairs, Africa	120 minutes	April 1, 2004	2210
An eyewitness account of 1994 Rwandan genocide and how it went unchallenged by the global community. (A Frontline co-production with the BBC and Silverbridge Productions Limited)
453	12	"Diet Wars"	Health/Medical	60 minutes	April 8, 2004	2211
How various diets are competing for marketshare and the attention of those wanting to shed weight, how they often contradict each other, and whether they actually work.
454	13	"Son of Al Qaeda"	Biographies, war on terror	60 minutes	April 22, 2004	2213
The story of Abdurahman Khadr, who was raised to be an Al Qaeda terrorist (his father was a longtime friend of Osama bin Laden) yet became an anti-terror informant for the CIA. (A Canadian Broadcasting Corporation production for Frontline)
455	14	"The Jesus Factor"	Politics, religion	60 minutes	April 29, 2004	2212
How his Christian faith plays a role in George W. Bush's governance and how his views mirror those of America's politically influential evangelical movement.
456	15	"The Way the Music Died"	Arts & entertainment	60 minutes	May 27, 2004	2214
How everything from industry consolidation to internet piracy to MTV have contributed to a perfect storm that envelopes and endangers the music industry.
457	16	"The Plea"	Criminal justice	90 minutes	June 17, 2004	2215
An examination of the push to resolve criminal cases through plea bargains and its moral, judicial, and constitutional implications on the American jurisprudence system.
458	17	"Sacred Ground"	Business, infrastructure	60 minutes	September 7, 2004	2216
A look at the debate over redeveloping the World Trade Center site and the design of the Freedom Tower.
459	1	"The Choice 2004"	Biographies	120 minutes	October 12, 2004	2301
Biographies on presidential candidates George W. Bush and John Kerry.
460	2	"Rumsfeld's War"	Military/defense	60 minutes	October 26, 2004	2302
A look at the aggressive attempts by Defense Secretary Donald Rumsfeld and his allies to assert civilian control on the United States Military. (A joint report by Frontline and The Washington Post)
461	3	"The Persuaders"	Business, marketing	90 minutes	November 9, 2004	2303
Douglas Rushkoff takes an in-depth look at the "persuasion industries" of advertising and public relations, and how marketers have developed new ways of deciphering and creating marketing messages that resonate with and influence Americans.
462	4	"Is Wal-Mart Good for America?"	Business/Economy	60 minutes	November 16, 2004	2304
Hedrick Smith examines whether Wal-Mart, in its zeal to offer low-cost goods to shoppers, is the main force driving the production of American products to China (resulting in a decreased standard of living back home).
463	5	"The Secret History of the Credit Card"	Business/Economy	60 minutes	November 23, 2004	2305
Lowell Bergman looks at how credit cards have become the most profitable sector of the American banking industry, whose marking, techniques, and political influence have contributed to a rise in personal debt and bankruptcies. (A joint investigation of Frontline and The New York Times)

=== Season 23 (2005) ===
No. overall	No. in season	Title	Topic(s)	Running time	Original release date	Prod. code
464	6	"Al Qaeda's New Front"	War on terror	60 minutes	January 25, 2005	2306
An investigation into the threat radical jihadists pose to Western Europe and its allies, as well as the related challenges posed to intelligence services on both sides of the Atlantic. (A joint investigation by Frontline, The New York Times, and CBC Television's The Fifth Estate)
465	7	"House of Saud"	Foreign affairs	120 minutes	February 8, 2005	2307
A look at how Saudi Arabia's ruling royal family has maintained its hold on power in the face of ever-growing tensions between Islam and modernity, as well as its relations with the U.S. from the 1930s to the present day.
466	8	"A Company of Soldiers"	Iraq War	60 minutes	February 22, 2005	2308
An intimate look from inside the U.S. Army's 8th Cavalry Regiment stationed in Baghdad as it faces a dramatic increase in insurgent attacks.
467	9	"The Soldier's Heart"	Psychology, military	60 minutes	March 1, 2005	2309
A look at soldiers who return home bearing psychological trauma from their war experience, and whether the government is making any effort to help.
468	10	Israel's Next War	Middle East	60 minutes	April 5, 2005	2311
Dan Setton's investigation of the rise of right-wing religious extremism in Israel and how it could play as a "spoiler" in peace negotiations with the Palestinians.
469	11	"Karl Rove: The Architect"	Biographies	60 minutes	April 12, 2005	2310
A look into the political history and modus operandi of Karl Rove, who has been on the inside of every political and policy decision of the Bush administration. (A joint report by Frontline and The Washington Post)
470	12	Death of a Princess	Middle East	120 minutes	April 19, 2005	2312
A re-airing of Antony Thomas' controversial 1980 docudrama (which aired on Frontline's predecessor program World) depicting the public execution of a Saudi Arabian princess and her lover for adultery. The rebroadcast features new interviews with those involved with the film, a look at the controversies that surrounded it, and how the lives of Arab women have and have not changed in 25 years.
471	13	"The New Asylums"	Health, criminal justice	60 minutes	May 10, 2005	2313
A close-up look inside Ohio's state prison system highlights this exploration of the issue of mentally ill inmates serving time in America's prisons and jails.
472	14	"A Jew Among the Germans"	World War II	60 minutes	May 31, 2005	2314
Holocaust survivor Marian Marzynski sets out to find out how Germans are willing to build a memorial to the 6 million Jews murdered during the Holocaust — and in turn how Germans young and old are dealing with their country's dark history.
473	15	"Private Warriors"	Middle East	60 minutes	June 21, 2005	2315
Martin Smith examines the use of private contractors to provide armed protection and logistical support to U.S. forces in the Iraq War.
474	16	"The O.J. Verdict"	Criminal justice, race/multicultural	60 minutes	October 4, 2005	2316
A look at the "perfect storm" that was the O. J. Simpson murder case and the reactions and thoughts 10 years after Simpson's acquittal.
475	1	"The Torture Question"	War on terror	60 minutes	October 18, 2005	2401
How decisions within the Bush administration led to its robust yet controversial policy of applying "coercive interrogation" on enemy fighters in the war on terror.
476	2	"The Last Abortion Clinic"	Health	60 minutes	November 8, 2005	2402
How pro-life advocates have waged a successful campaign to enact state laws regulating and limiting the availability of abortion services.
477	3	"The Storm"	Infrastructure, politics	60 minutes	November 22, 2005	2403
Martin Smith reviews the response of key political figures before and after Hurricane Katrina's destruction on the U.S. Gulf Coast.

=== Season 24 (2006) ===
No. overall	No. in season	Title	Topic(s)	Running time	Original release date	Prod. code
478 480	4 6	Country Boys	Biographies	120 minutes 120 minutes 120 minutes	January 9, 2006 January 10, 2006 January 11, 2006	2404 2405 2406
David Sutherland's 3-part documentary profile of two boys struggling to overcome hardship and poverty while coming of age in the Appalachian region of eastern Kentucky.
481	7	"Sex Slaves"	Social issues	60 minutes	February 7, 2006	2408
An undercover exploration of the world of global sex trafficking and how it has gone unchecked, centering on one man's journey to liberate his kidnapped wife from the sex trade. (A co-production of Frontline, Channel 4, Canadian Broadcasting Corporation, and Canal D)
482	8	"The Meth Epidemic"	Health, social issues	60 minutes	February 14, 2006	2407
An investigation into how and why methamphetamine abuse has become the fastest-growing drug abuse problem in America. (A reporting partnership of Frontline and The Oregonian)
483	9	"The Insurgency"	Middle East	60 minutes	February 21, 2006	2409
A look at the people who are fighting against U.S. and coalition forces in Iraq, the civilians who have been targeted, and whether the insurgents can be contained.
484	10	"The Tank Man"	Biographies, foreign affairs	60 minutes	April 11, 2006	2410
Antony Thomas searches for the identity of the unknown protester who stood before a column of Chinese army tanks in the aftermath of the Tiananmen Square protests of 1989, while in the process examining the cultural and technological divides in China and how its government has sought to erase the protests from the country's collective history. (A co-production with Channel 4)
485	11	"Can You Afford to Retire?"	Economics/financial	60 minutes	May 16, 2006	2411
Hedrick Smith looks at how pension cuts, corporate bankruptcies, and stock market upheaval have led to the crisis for baby boomers: Whether they'll have enough money to live off of during their retirement years.
486 487	12 13	"The Age of AIDS (Parts 1 & 2)"	Health/Medical	120 minutes 120 minutes	May 30, 2006 May 31, 2006	2412 2413
A look at the HIV/AIDS epidemic, covering the early concerns, subsequent medical advancements, and cultural and political fears that have been alleviated or still linger in the 25 years since the disease was first diagnosed.
488	14	"The Dark Side"	Foreign affairs, war on terror	90 minutes	June 20, 2006	2414
Interviews and documented evidence buoy this investigation into the Bush administration's mission (spearheaded by Vice President Dick Cheney) to expand executive power, transform American intelligence, bring the war on terror to Iraq, and project American superiority worldwide in the years post-9/11.
489	1	"Return of the Taliban"	Afghanistan/Pakistan	60 minutes	October 3, 2006	2501
Reports from the lawless Pakistani tribal areas along the Afghanistan-Pakistan border and reveals how the area has fallen under the control of a resurgent Taliban militia.
490	2	"The Enemy Within"	War on terror	60 minutes	October 10, 2006	2502
Lowell Bergman looks at major domestic terrorism cases and reveals major flaws in the U.S. government's investigation efforts. (Co-produced with The New York Times)
491	3	"The Lost Year in Iraq"	Middle East	60 minutes	October 17, 2006	2503
A look at multiple failures in the reconstruction efforts headed by the ORHA and the CPA, and how those involved became hardened to the realities of post-Saddam Iraq.
492	4	"A Hidden Life"	Politics, media	60 minutes	November 14, 2006	2504
A look into the scandal surrounding Spokane mayor Jim West, who gained prominence as a socially conservative politician yet, as revealed by a Spokesman-Review sting, surfed online for sexual relationships with young men.
493	5	"Living Old"	Health	60 minutes	November 21, 2006	2415
A look into the repercussions of Americans living longer than ever (into their 80s and 90s) on not only them and their loved ones, but on the American health care system.

=== Season 25 (2007) ===
As part of its 25th season, Frontline presented a four-part series titled News War. Featuring 3 Frontline episodes and a fourth on its offshoot series Frontline World, News War explored the news media's reaction to the various internal and external forces (political, cultural, legal, economic) that changes and challenges its role in society. News War was a co-production of Frontline and the UC Berkeley Graduate School of Journalism.

No. overall	No. in season	Title	Topic(s)	Running time	Original release date	Prod. code
494	6	Hand of God	Religion, family/children	60 minutes	January 16, 2007	2507
Joe Cultrera documents efforts by his brother, Paul, to reveal Paul's abuse by their Catholic church priest in the 1960s.
News War documentary
495	7	News War: Secrets, Sources & Spin, Part I	Media	60 minutes	February 13, 2007	2505
Lowell Bergman explores controversies over journalism's use of anonymous sources, the relationship between the press and the Bush administration, and the unintended (and damaging) consequences of the Valerie Plame investigation.
496	8	News War: Secrets, Sources & Spin, Part II	Media	60 minutes	February 20, 2007	2505A
A look into recent First Amendment legal battles between the U.S. government and the press, how and why reporters are compelled to reveal their confidential sources, and how much the press can reveal about government secrecy in the war on terror.
497	9	News War: What's Happening with the News	Media	60 minutes	February 27, 2007	2506
How mainstream media and in-depth reporting has been upended in a changing world of profit pressures, corporate cost cutting, and increased competition from cable news networks and the internet.
498	10	News War: Stories from a Small Planet	Media	60 minutes	March 27, 2007	2506A
In Frontline World's entry in the News War series, Greg Barker looks at the international forces influencing journalism and politics, specifically the rise of Al Jazeera and its impact on Arab media and the clash between the West and Islam.
Remainder of season 25
499	11	So Much So Fast	Health, family	90 minutes	April 3, 2007	2508
Steven Ascher and Jeanne Jordan's profile of Stephen Heywood, his family, and their response to Stephen's being diagnosed with Amyotrophic lateral sclerosis.
500	12	"Gangs of Iraq"	Middle East	60 minutes	April 17, 2007	ACRO103
A look at how U.S. forces' training efforts to retrain Iraq's army and police force so that they can combat the country's post-war violence.
501	13	"Hot Politics"	Environment	60 minutes	April 24, 2007	2510
How bi-partisan political and economic forces prevented the U.S. government from confronting what may be one of the most serious problems facing humanity today — climate change — and how state & local governments and the private sector are filling the leadership void on the topic. (An investigation by Frontline and the Center for Investigative Reporting)
502 503	14 15	The Mormons	Religion	120 minutes 120 minutes	April 30, 2007 May 1, 2007	MORM101 MORM102
A two-part profile of the Church of Jesus Christ of Latter-day Saints; how it grew to become an influential religion; and how it often remains misunderstood in American life. (A co-production of American Experience and Frontline)
504	16	"When Kids Get Life"	TBA	60 minutes	May 8, 2007	2511
505	17	"Spying on the Home Front"	National security	60 minutes	May 15, 2007	2512
Hedrick Smith profiles how the National Security Agency's domestic surveillance program and whether it is jeopardizing Americans' privacy and civil liberties.
506	18	"Endgame"	Middle East	60 minutes	June 19, 2007	2513
How strategic and tactical mistakes and an early mandate to create a quick American exit led to the chaos and sectarian strife that has brought Iraq to the brink of civil war.
507	1	"Cheney's Law"	Politics, war on terror	60 minutes	October 16, 2007	2601
How Vice President Dick Cheney pulled levers of power to give the presidency extraordinary executive power in times of war, even without the approval of Congress or review from the court system.
508	2	"Showdown with Iran"	Middle East	60 minutes	October 23, 2007	2602
A look at Iran's rise to power in the Middle East and its challenge to the U.S. for influence in the region.
509	3	"The Undertaking"	Health	60 minutes	October 30, 2007	2603
A look into the ritual of caring for the dead and their survivors, as seen through a family-owned funeral service in Michigan.
510	4	"On Our Watch"	Foreign Affairs	60 minutes	November 20, 2007	2604
How the United Nations, and the international community in general, failed to stop the Darfur genocide.

=== Season 26 (2008) ===
No. overall	No. in season	Title	Topic(s)	Running time	Original release date	Prod. code
511	5	"The Medicated Child"	Health/Medical	60 minutes	January 8, 2008	2605
A look at the increase in diagnoses of bipolar disorder and other psychiatric disorders in children, and how they're being prescribed anti-psychotic drugs that have had little or no prior testing.
512	6	"Growing Up Online"	Technology, youth/family	60 minutes	January 22, 2008	2606
How a whole generation has grown up with access to the internet and social media, and the risks and realities they face in the online world.
513	7	"A Dangerous Business Revisited"	Business/Economy/Financial	60 minutes	February 5, 2008	2109-003
Lowell Bergman revisits a Season 21 report on worker safety concerns at McWane's iron ore plants, and how the company has changed its ways in the face of regulatory and legal woes after the report. (A Frontline co-production with the Center for Investigative Reporting, Inc.)
514	8	"Rules of Engagement"	Middle East	60 minutes	February 19, 2008	2607
An examination of a 2005 massacre of unarmed civilians by Marine forces in Haditha, which led to one of the largest criminal cases against U.S. troops in the Iraq War.
515 516	9 10	"Bush's War"	Middle East, war on terror	120 minutes (both episodes)	March 23, 2008 March 24, 2008	2608 (Part 1) 2609 (Part 2)
A two part analysis of the Iraq War looks at the war's beginnings, how it has been fought, and the conflicts within the Bush administration over its progress.
517	11	"Bad Voodoo's War"	Iraq War	60 minutes	April 1, 2008	2610
Deborah Scranton provides cameras to California National Guard soldiers (part of "The Bad Voodoo Platoon"), allowing them to tell their own stories of deployment in Iraq.
518	12	"Sick Around the World"	Health/Medical	60 minutes	April 15, 2008	2611
T.R. Reid examines the health care systems of Germany, Japan, Switzerland, Taiwan, and the U.K. to see if any of their processes can be added to the U.S. system.
519	13	"Storm Over Everest"	Biographies	60 minutes	May 13, 2008	2612
David Breashears tells the story of what happened on a 1996 climb of Mount Everest, when a fast-moving blizzard trapped two climbing teams and led to the deaths of 8 climbers.
520	14	"Young & Restless in China"	Asia, biographies	60 minutes	June 17, 2008	2614
An intimate look into the lives of nine young Chinese as they scramble to keep pace with a fast-changing society.
521	1	"The Choice 2008"	Biographies	120 minutes	October 14, 2008	2701
Profiles of presidential candidates John McCain and Barack Obama.
522	2	"Heat"	Environment	60 minutes	October 21, 2008	2613
Martin Smith (documentarian) looks at how oil and coal companies, electric utilities, and car manufacturers are reshaping their approach to the environment after years of resistance to change.
523	3	"The War Briefing"	Foreign affairs	60 minutes	October 28, 2008	2702
Diplomats and strategists offer a look into the foreign policy choices the next U.S. President will face.
524	4	Boogie Man: The Lee Atwater Story	Biographies	90 minutes	November 11, 2008	2703
Stefan Forbes' documentary profile of Lee Atwater, the Machiavellian (and influential) GOP campaign operative who sought forgiveness from those hurt by his "politics as war" tactics before succumbing to a brain tumor at 40.
525	5	"The Hugo Chávez Show"	Biographies	60 minutes	November 25, 2008	2704
An illuminating look at Venezuelan president Hugo Chávez, his mercurial rise to power, and how the mercurial leader has sparked socialist revolutions not only throughout his country but also through television.

=== Season 27 (2009) ===
No. overall	No. in season	Title	Topic(s)	Running time	Original release date	Prod. code
526	6	"The Old Man and the Storm"	Cities	60 minutes	January 6, 2009	2705
The difficulties of rebuilding post-Katrina New Orleans as seen through producer June Cross' profile of 82-year-old Herbert Gettridge and his family, and how urban planning, public health, and insurance industry decisions affected their attempts to rebuild their homes and lives.
527	7	"Dreams of Obama"	Biographies	60 minutes	January 20, 2009	2706
On the day Barack Obama takes office, Michael Kirk explores how Obama's life experiences and political career allowed him to his becoming America's first Black president.
528	8	"My Father, My Brother, and Me"	Health	60 minutes	February 3, 2009	2707
Dave Iverson explores the scientific, ethical, and political debates that surround Parkinson's disease, speaking with scientists exploring cutting-edge cures and therapies, as well as fellow Parkinson's sufferers (Iverson was diagnosed with the disease in 2004). (A joint production of Frontline and ITVS)
529	9	"Inside the Meltdown"	Business/Economy	60 minutes	February 17, 2009	2708
How the 2008 financial crisis developed, why investment banks went under or had to be bailed out, and what the US Treasury Secretary and Federal Reserve Chairman could and could not fix.
530	10	"Ten Trillion and Counting"	Business/Economy	60 minutes	March 24, 2009	2709
The causes, potential outcomes of, and possible solutions to the growing U.S. public debt ($10 trillion and counting).
531	11	"Sick Around America"	Health	60 minutes	March 31, 2009	2710
How a worsening economy, major illnesses, and insurance company decisions are impacting the American health care system.
532	12	"Black Money"	Business/Economy	60 minutes	April 7, 2009	2711
Lowell Bergman examines the shadowy world of international bribery, and how multinational companies maneuver to get billions of dollars in business.
533	13	"Poisoned Waters"	Environment	60 minutes	April 21, 2009	2712
Hedrick Smith examines the rising hazards to human health and ecosystem caused by polluted U.S. waterways, as well as the difficulties to keep our waters clean.
534	14	"The Released"	Criminal Justice	60 minutes	April 28, 2009	2713
What happens to mentally ill prisoners when they finish their time and leave prison, and why they return to incarceration at such alarming rates.
535	15	"The Madoff Affair"	Business/Economy	60 minutes	May 12, 2009	2714
Unraveling the story behind the world's first global Ponzi Scheme.
536	16	"Breaking the Bank"	Business/Economy	60 minutes	June 16, 2009	2715
The inside story of how big bets and hopes of billions of dollars in revenues led instead to the 2008 financial crisis, harming banks, in particular Bank of America.
537	1	"Obama's War"	Foreign affairs	60 minutes	October 13, 2009	2801
A look at American counter-insurgency strategy in Afghanistan and Pakistan, a fight that promises to be longer and more costly than most Americans understand.
538	2	"The Warning"	Business/Economy	60 minutes	October 20, 2009	2802
An examination into why the 2008 financial crisis happened and how it might have been prevented, in particular the hesitancy to regulate the derivatives markets.
539	3	Close to Home	Business/Economy	60 minutes	October 27, 2009	2803
Ofra Bikel turns to a New York City hair salon she frequents and sees the struggles of a small business owner, her sister's risk of imminent foreclosure on her Florida home, and how their various clients are getting buy in turbulent financial times.
540	4	"Alaska Gold"	Environment	60 minutes	November 10, 2009	2804
The growing battle in Alaska's Bristol Bay region between two industries — fishermen who prize the bay's salmon population, and mining companies who want to reap its enormous mineral deposits.
541	5	"A Death in Tehran"	Middle East	60 minutes	November 17, 2009	2805
How Neda Agha-Soltan, whose lost her life during election protests, became the face of a movement that threatened the hard-line Iranian government's hold on power.
542	6	The Card Game	Business/Economy/Financial Crisis	60 minutes	November 24, 2009	2806
Lowell Bergman examines the future of the massive consumer loan industry, its impact on a fragile national economy, and what's ahead for customers and banks as possible new regulations await. (A joint project with The New York Times)

=== Season 28 (2010) ===
No. overall	No. in season	Title	Topic(s)	Running time	Original release date	Prod. code
543	7	Digital Nation	Family/Children	90 minutes	February 2, 2010	2809
A look at "the risks and possibilities, myths and realities" of "life on the digital frontier".
544	8	Flying Cheap	Transportation	60 minutes	February 9, 2010	2810
How low-cost airlines and regional carriers have changed the airline business, and whether safety has been sacrificed in the quest for greater profits.
545	9	Behind Taliban Lines	Afghanistan/Pakistan, Iraq/war on terror	60 minutes	February 23, 2010	2813
An Afghan journalist's 10 days living with an insurgent cell allied with Al Qaeda that's planning to sabotage a key U.S./NATO supply route.
546	10	The Suicide Tourist	Social Issues	60 minutes	March 2, 2010	2811
John Zaritsky follows a Chicago native suffering from ALS as he travels to Switzerland in order to take his life with help of a nonprofit organization that offers legally assisted suicides.
547	11	The Quake	World	60 minutes	March 30, 2010	2814
An in-depth look at the earthquake in Haiti examines problems with relief efforts and issues with governmental management, as well as the quake's effects on people's lives.
548	12	Obama's Deal	U.S. Politics	60 minutes	April 13, 2010	2815
An inside look at efforts by the Obama administration's efforts to pass the Affordable Care Act.
549	13	The Dancing Boys of Afghanistan	World	52 minutes	April 20, 2010	2807
Najibullah Quraishi's documentary looks at a practice in Afghanistan in which boys as young as 11 are sold into sexual slavery and child prostitution.
550	14	The Vaccine War	Health/Medical	60 minutes	April 27, 2010	2816
The debate between those in scientific medicine and public health who tout the medical benefits of vaccines and a populist coalition who express hesitancy over their administration.
551	15	College, Inc.	Business and Economy / Education	60 minutes	May 4, 2010	2817
A look at for-profit colleges and universities in the U.S. and the effect of their recruitment methods, online curriculum, and connections to big business.
552	16	The Wounded Platoon	Military / Health	90 minutes	May 18, 2010	2812
A look at the violence, depression, and stress exhibited by a platoon of Iraq War veterans whose members who have committed murder and assault or have taken their own lives.
553	17	Law & Disorder	Criminal justice	60 minutes	August 25, 2010	2818
A look into several questionable shootings by the New Orleans Police Department in the wake of Hurricane Katrina.
554	18	God in America	Religion	60 minutes	October 11, 2010	0000
The 400-year history of the intersection of religion and public life in the United States of America. (A co-production of American Experience and Frontline)
555	1	Death by Fire	Criminal Justice	60 minutes	October 19, 2010	2901
At the center of the national death penalty debate today is the controversial case of Cameron Todd Willingham, put to death for the arson-murder of his three little girls. But was he guilty?
556	2	The Spill	Business and Economy	60 minutes	October 26, 2010	2902
Frontline investigates BP's record of safety violations and accidents in the years leading up to the Deepwater Horizon disaster in the Gulf.
557	3	The Confessions	Criminal Justice	90 minutes	November 9, 2010	2903
Frontline looks at the case of the Norfolk Four in which four men were convicted of the rape and murder of a woman on the basis of coerced confessions.
558	4	Facing Death	Health/Medical	60 minutes	November 23, 2010	2904
The end-of-life choices made by physicians and families

=== Season 29 (2011) ===
No. overall	No. in season	Title	Topic(s)	Running time	Original release date	Prod. code
559	5	Battle for Haiti	Foreign affairs	60 minutes	January 11, 2011	2905
In the chaos of the earthquake that devastated Haiti, thousands of the country's worst criminals seized the opportunity to stage a mass escape from the National Penitentiary. One year later, the gang leaders are re-asserting control in the capital, threatening the country's stability.
560	6	Are We Safer? Flying Cheaper	War on terror	22 minutes 20 minutes	January 18, 2011	2906
Are We Safer?: Dana Priest investigates the terrorism-industrial complex that grew up in the wake of 9/11. Flying Cheaper: A follow-up to Season 28's Flying Cheap examines the trend of airlines outsourcing Maintenance; a co-production with the Investigative Reporting Workshop.
561	7	Post Mortem	Criminal justice	60 minutes	February 1, 2011	2907
A collaboration with NPR and ProPublica reveals how dysfunction, low standards, and lax oversight impacts investigations into sudden or suspicious deaths.
562	9	Revolution in Cairo	Foreign Affairs/Defense/Military	60 minutes	February 22, 2011	0000
A look at the April 6 Youth Movement, the Muslim Brotherhood, and the Egyptian Revolution of 2011.
563	10	Money and March Madness Who's Afraid of Ai Weiwei The Private Life of Bradley Manning	Biographies	22 minutes 18 minutes 10 minutes	March 29, 2011	2910
Money and March Madness: An inside look at the multibillion-dollar business of the NCAA and its brand of amateur college sports. Who's Afraid of Ai Weiwei: How Ai Weiwei dares to walk the fine line between freedom and censorship in China. The Private Life of Bradley Manning: Exclusive interview with Private Manning's father, who speaks out for the first time about his son's upbringing and troubled youth.
564	11	Football High	Education, Sports	60 minutes	April 12, 2011	2911
High school football has never had a higher profile ... but is winning worth the risks?
565	12	The Silence	Criminal Justice / Religion and Beliefs	60 minutes	April 19, 2011	2912
Frontline reveals a little-known chapter of the Catholic Church sex abuse story: decades of abuse of Native Americans by priests and other church workers in Alaska.
566	13	Fighting for Bin Laden	Afghanistan/Pakistan	60 minutes	May 3, 2011	2913
The fight against al Qaeda and the Taliban in Afghanistan and Pakistan.
567	14	Kill/Capture	Afghanistan/Pakistan, Iraq/war on terror	60 minutes	May 10, 2011	2914
Goes inside the "kill/capture" program to discover new evidence of the program's effect and its costs.
568	15	WikiSecrets	Foreign Affairs/Defense/Military	60 minutes	May 24, 2011	2915
The inside story of Chelsea Manning, Julian Assange (WikiLeaks) and the largest intelligence breach in U.S. history.
569	16	The Child Cases Educating Sergeant Pantzke	Criminal Justice Education	32 minutes 18 minutes	June 28, 2011	2916
The Child Cases: Ernie Lopez to prison for 60 years when a child dies under suspicious circumstances. Now a Texas judge has moved to overturn Lopez's conviction, and questions are raised about the quality of expert testimony in this and many other cases. Educating Sergeant Pantzke: In a follow-up to College, Inc., FRONTLINE investigates how the for-profit schools are recruiting veterans with educational promises that they may not keep.
570	17	The Pot Republic Doctor Hotspot The Atomic Artists	Business and Economy / Social Issues Health World	25 minutes 13 minutes 12 minutes	July 26, 2011	2917
The Pot Republic: FRONTLINE and The Center for Investigative Reporting team up to investigate California's marijuana market. Doctor Hotspot: Dr. Jeffrey Brenner and his team are pioneering a practice called "hotspotting", in which medical care is focused on the hardest-to-treat to improve their health and dramatically reduce costs. The Atomic Artists: FRONTLINE with PRI's The World meet Chim?Pom, a provocative group of young artists using art to challenge the status quo and ask Japan to rethink their way of life.
571	18	Top Secret America	Iraq/war on terror	60 minutes	September 6, 2011	2918
A report from the Washington Post on US government intelligence spending. (See Top Secret America)
572	19	An Optimist in Haiti	Poverty	60 minutes	September 27, 2011	2919
The struggle of one man to develop a tourist destination in Haiti and bring economic prosperity.
573	19	The Man Behind the Mosque	Race/Multicultural, Religion	60 minutes	September 27, 2011	2919
The struggles of Sharif El-Gamal to build a mosque near the site of the World Trade Center.
574	1	The Anthrax Files	Criminal Justice / U.S. Politics	60 minutes	October 11, 2011	3001
Frontline, with ProPublica and McClatchy Newspapers, takes a hard look at the FBI's investigation of the country's most notorious act of bioterrorism.
575	2	Lost in Detention	Immigration / Social Issues	60 minutes	October 18, 2011	3002
An investigation into the Obama administration's enforcement strategies and immigrant detention, particularly who is being detained and what is happening to these detainees.
576	3	Syria Undercover The Regime	War and Conflict / World	60 minutes	November 8, 2011	3003
Syria Undercover: Reporter Ramita Navai goes undercover for a rare look at the uprising from inside Syria. The Regime: A profile of the dictator who has managed to hold on longer than any amidst the Arab unrest—President Bashar al-Assad.
577	4	A Perfect Terrorist	Afghanistan/Pakistan	60 minutes	November 22, 2011	3004
Life of a Pakistani-American David Headley.

=== Season 30 (2012) ===
No. overall	No. in season	Title	Topic(s)	Running time	Original release date	Prod. code
578	5	Opium Brides	World	33 minutes	January 3, 2012	3005
Frontline reports on the unexpected collateral damage of the counter-narcotics effort in Afghanistan.
579	6	Nuclear Aftershocks	Environment, Health/Science/Technology	60 minutes	January 17, 2012	2921
Frontline travels to three continents to explore the debate about nuclear power: Is it safe? What are the alternatives? And could a Fukushima-style disaster. happen in the U.S.?
580	7	The Interrupters	Biographies, Criminal Justice	120 minutes	February 14, 2012	3006
An intimate journey across the violent landscape of our cities through the eyes of those fighting to sow peace and security.
581	8	Inside Japan's Nuclear Meltdown	Environment, Foreign Affairs/Defense, Health/Science/Technology	60 minutes	February 28, 2012	3008
An unprecedented account of the crisis inside the Fukushima Daiichi nuclear disaster.
582	9	Murdoch's Scandal	Business and Economy	60 minutes	March 27, 2012	3009
Accounts of bribery, blackmail, and privacy invasions has prompted criminal investigations on both sides of the Atlantic.
583	10	The Real CSI	Criminal Justice	60 minutes	April 17, 2012	3010
How reliable is the science behind forensics? A Frontline investigation finds serious flaws in some of the best-known tools of forensic science.
584 587	11 14	Money, Power and Wall Street Parts I-IV	Money, Power and Wall Street	60 minutes	April 24, 2012 April 24, 2012 May 1, 2012 May 1, 2012	3011 3012 3013 3014
Frontline tells the inside story of the 2008 financial crisis. (four one-hour episodes, May 4 premier concluded).
588	15	Cell Tower Deaths Six Billion Dollar Bet	Business and Economy	30 minutes 21 minutes	May 22, 2012	3007
Cell Tower Deaths: Learn about the hidden cost of better and faster cell phone service and unreliable medical evidence in several child death cases. Six Billion Dollar Bet: Jon Corzine, former head of Goldman Sachs and political power broker, took over MF Global in the spring of 2010 and lost a massive bet on European debt, with more than a billion dollars of customer funds missing. FRONTLINE investigates how Corzine's traders went around MF Global's risk officers and how he swayed regulators in Washington to allow risky practices to continue.
589	16	Al Qaeda in Yemen	Terrorism / World	60 minutes	May 29, 2012	3016
Frontline travels into the heart of Yemen's radical heartland, and shows how Al Queda is taking control of towns and cities in an attempt to establish its own state.
590	17	Dollars and Dentists	Health	53 minutes	June 26, 2012	3018
Miles O'Brien examines how millions of Americans cannot afford or are unable to receive dental care. (Reported in partnership with The Center for Public Integrity)
591	18	Endgame: Aids in Black America	Health / Social Issues	120 minutes	July 10, 2012	3017
A tracing of the AIDS epidemic and how it has affected the Black community (nearly one-half of those with the disease are Black men, women, and children).
592	19	Fast Times at West Philly High Middle School Moment	Education	36 minutes 14 minutes	July 17, 2012	3015
Fast Times at West Philly High: Students and teachers from West Philadelphia High School, a public school serving one of Philly's most disadvantaged neighborhoods, defy expectations as they design and build two super-hybrid cars for international competition and compete for the chance to be part of a technological revolution. Middle School Moment: With new evidence suggesting that the make-or-break moment for high school dropouts may actually occur in middle school, this film explores how one Bronx school is using a novel form of data collection and analysis to predict and prevent dropouts before they happen.
593	20	Alaska Gold	Business/Economy/Financial, Environment, Health/Science/Technology	60 minutes	July 24, 2012	3004
Frontline probes the fault lines of a growing battle in the Bristol Bay region of Alaska, home to the world's last great wild sockeye salmon fishery-and enormous mineral deposits.
594	21	The Battle for Syria	Foreign Affairs/Defense	60 minutes	September 18, 2012	3019
Frontline takes you inside the heart of the insurgency, where rebel groups are waging a full-scale assault on the forces of President Bashar al Assad.
595	22	Dropout Nation	Education in the United States	120 minutes	September 25, 2012	3020
What does it take to save a student?
596	1	The Choice 2012	Government/Elections/Politics	120 minutes	October 9, 2012	3101
2012 United States presidential election
597	2	Climate of Doubt	Climate change denial and the climate change controversy regarding public opinion on climate change	60 minutes	October 23, 2012	3021
Featured Tim Phillips (political strategist) of Americans for Prosperity, Andrew Dessler, Bob Inglis a US Republican Representative who lost after to not denying anthropogenic climate change (global warming), Steve Coll, the Heartland Institute, Donors Trust, Myron Ebell of the Competitive Enterprise Institute, Cato Institute, Fred Singer, Willie Soon, Drexel University sociologist Robert Brulle, and others.
598	3	Big Sky, Big Money	Government/Elections/Politics	60 minutes	October 30, 2012	3022
A discussion of the impacts of the Supreme Court's decision in Citizens United v. FEC.
599	4	The Suicide Plan	Social Issues	85 minutes	November 13, 2012	3023
Explore the shadow world of assisted suicide, where the lines between legality and criminality are blurred.
600	5	Poor Kids	Business/Economy/Financial	60 minutes	November 20, 2012	3024
Poverty And surrounding issues in USA.
601	6	Secret War Opium Brides	Terrorism / World World	18 minutes 33 minutes	January 3, 2012	3105
Secret War: Stephen Grey and Martin Smith go inside the deepest front in America's war against Al Qaeda and the Taliban: Pakistan. Opium Brides: Najibullah Quraishi reports on the harrowing story of the collateral damage of the counter-narcotics effort.

=== Season 31 (2013) ===
No. overall	No. in season	Title	Topic(s)	Running time	Original release date	Prod. code
602	7	The Education of Michelle Rhee	Education, Family/Children	60 minutes	January 8, 2013	3102
Biography and in depth look at one of the most controversial educational reformers in the modern era.
603	8	Inside Obama's Presidency	Government/Elections/Politics	60 minutes	January 15, 2013	3103
A look inside the first term of the Barack Obama presidency and an eye to the second.
604	9	The Untouchables	Business/Economy/Financial, Government/Elections/Politics	60 minutes	January 22, 2013	3104
A look inside the lack of prosecutions on Wall Street after the Great Recession
605	10	Cliffhanger	Business/Economy/Financial, Government/Elections/Politics	60 minutes	February 12, 2013	3105
The inside history of how Washington has failed to solve the country's problems of debt and deficit
606	11	Raising Adam Lanza Newtown Divided	Biographies, Criminal Justice Social Issues	32 minutes 20 minutes	February 19, 2013	3106
Raising Adam Lanza : In depth look at the history of Adam Lanza, the Newtown shooter. Newtown Divided : In depth look at the Newtown shooting and all surrounding issues.
607 608	12 13	Kind Hearted Woman (Parts 1 & 2)	Biographies	120 minutes 180 minutes	April 1, 2013 April 2, 2013	3199
A portrait of Robin Charboneau, a 32-year-old divorced single mother and Oglala Sioux woman living on North Dakota's Spirit Lake Reservation. Kind Hearted Woman is a special co-presentation of FRONTLINE and Independent Lens.
609	14	Syria Behind the Lines	Foreign Affairs/Defense	60 minutes	April 9, 2013	3107
Everyday life of both the Syrian rebels and the Bashar al-Assad regime.
610	15	The Retirement Gamble	Business/Economy/Financial, Social Issues	60 minutes	April 23, 2013	3108
Reform and common pitfalls in regards to retirement, IRA's and 401k, and less risky and less costly index funds.
611	16	Top Secret America: 9/11 to the Boston Bombings	Iraq/war on terror	60 minutes	April 30, 2013	3118
An updated version of Top Secret America which traces the journey from 9/11 to the Boston Marathon bombings and investigates the secret history of the 12-year battle against terrorism.
612	17	Never Forget to Lie	Family/Children, Social Issues	60 minutes	May 14, 2013	3109
Filmmaker Marian Marzynski returns to Poland to explore his own wartime childhood and the experiences of other child survivors of the Holocaust.
613	18	Outlawed in Pakistan	Afghanistan/Pakistan	60 minutes	May 28, 2013	3110
The story of a girl in Pakistan whose life is at risk for daring to allege rape.
614	19	Rape in the Fields	Criminal Justice, Social Justice	60 minutes	June 25, 2013	3111
Lowell Bergman investigates the hidden reality of rape on the job for immigrant women working in America's fields, farms and factories. Co-produced with Documentales Univisión and the Center for Investigative Reporting (CIR).
615	20	Two American Families	Family/Children, Social Issues	85 minutes	July 9, 2013	3112
Bill Moyers chronicles the lives of two ordinary families over more than 20 years as they battle to keep from sliding into poverty.
616	21	Life and Death in Assisted Living	Family/Children, Social Issues	60 minutes	July 30, 2013	3113
Frontline and ProPublica investigate assisted living in America.
617	1	Egypt in Crisis	World	60 minutes	September 17, 2013	3201
Middle East Correspondents Martin Smith and Charles Sennott examine the rise and rapid fall of Egypt's Muslim Brotherhood.
618	2	League of Denial: The NFL's Concussion Crisis	Health/Science/Technology, Sports	115 minutes	October 8, 2013	3202
The epidemic of concussions among National Football League players, their lingering effects, and the league's efforts to downplay the issue
619	3	Hunting the Nightmare Bacteria	Health/Science/Technology	60 minutes	October 22, 2013	3114
Frontline investigates the rise of deadly drug-resistant bacteria.
620	4	Who Was Lee Harvey Oswald?	Biographies	85 minutes	November 19, 2013	3204
50th anniversary shortened repeat of 1993 broadcast: Investigative biography examining the Kennedy assassination by exploring the life of Lee Harvey Oswald.
621	5	A Death in St. Augustine	Criminal Justice	60 minutes	November 26, 2013	3115
What happens when the police face the possibility of domestic violence within their ranks?

=== Season 32 (2014) ===
No. overall	No. in season	Title	Topic(s)	Running time	Original release date	Prod. code
622	6	To Catch a Trader	Business/Economy/Financial, Criminal Justice	60 minutes	January 7, 2014	3205
Frontline goes inside the hunt that uncovered vast insider trading on Wall Street.
623	7	Secret State of North Korea	North Korea	60 minutes	January 14, 2014	3206
Using undercover footage, Frontline explores life under Kim Jong-un.
624	8	Syria's Second Front Children of Aleppo	Syria	22 minutes 29 minutes	February 11, 2014	3208
Syria's Second Front: Three years into Syria's war, another enemy has emerged: extremists aligned with Al Qaeda. Children of Aleppo: Three years into Syria's war, another enemy has emerged: extremists aligned with Al Qaeda.
625	9	Generation Like	Social media	60 minutes	February 18, 2014	3207
What happens when the traditional teenage quest for identity and connection occurs online?
626	10	Secrets of the Vatican	Vatican City	90 minutes	February 25, 2014	3216
An inside look at the scandals that rocked Benedict's papacy.
627	11	TB Silent Killer	Health/Science/Technology	90 minutes	March 25, 2014	3217
An unforgettable portrait of lives forever changed by tuberculosis.
628 629	12 13	Locked up in America; Part One: Solitary Nation; Part Two: Prison State	Criminal Justice	90 minutes	April 22, 2014 April 29, 2014	3209 3210
Two raw, explosive films that explore America's fixation on incarceration.
630 631	14 15	United States of Secrets; Part One: The Program; Part Two: Privacy Lost	Surveillance & Privacy	60 minutes	May 13, 2014 May 20, 2014	3212
Lawmakers and whistleblowers describe the surveillance state that developed in the wake of 9/11, largely exposed in 2013. Intelligence agencies routinely track individuals online using commercial data, as well as demand information from internet providers and phone companies.
632	16	Battle for Ukraine Syria: Arming the Rebels	Foreign Affairs/Defense	32 minutes 18 minutes	May 27, 2014	3213
Battle for Ukraine: Explores the deep-seated hatreds on both sides of the conflict. Syria: Arming the Rebels: Reporter Muhammad Ali crosses into the war zone, and finds Syrian rebel fighters who say they're being secretly armed and trained by the United States.
633	17	Separate and Unequal Omarina's Story	Social Issues / Race / Education	28 minutes 23 minutes	July 15, 2014	3214
Separate and Unequal: Sixty years after the Supreme Court declared separate schools for Black and white children unconstitutional, school segregation is making a comeback. Omarina's Story: As part of an examination of the school dropout crisis, FRONTLINE catches up with Omarina Cabrera, who was profiled in Season 30's Middle School Moment and is now excelling in a New England prep school.
634	18	Losing Iraq	Foreign Affairs/Defense	90 minutes	July 29, 2014	3215
U.S. troops withdrew from Iraq in 2011, ending America's military commitment in the country. Now, chaos is once again engulfing Iraq.
635	1	Ebola Outbreak Hunting Boko Haram	Health / World Terrorism / World	28 minutes 25 minutes	September 9, 2014	3217
Ebola Outbreak: From the epicenter of the Ebola outbreak, Frontline follows health officials tracking the deadly disease and trying to stop its rampant spread. With special access to teams fighting Ebola in Sierra Leone, the film shows how the outbreak is endangering health- care workers, overwhelming hospitals and getting worse. Also this hour, Frontline investigates accounts that members of the Nigerian military have been committing atrocities in the fight against Boko Haram – the Islamist militants who kidnapped nearly 300 schoolgirls in April. Hunting Boko Haram: FRONTLINE investigates evidence that in the fight against Boko Haram, members of the Nigerian military and state-sponsored militias have been committing atrocities against suspects, many of them innocent civilians.
636	2	The Trouble with Antibiotics	Health/Science/Technology	60 minutes	October 14, 2014	3301
Frontline investigates the widespread use of antibiotics in food animals and whether it is fueling the growing crisis of antibiotic resistance in people. Also this hour: An exclusive interview with the family of a young man who died in a Nightmare bacteria outbreak that swept through a hospital at the National Institutes of Health.
637	3	The Rise of ISIS	Foreign Affairs/Defense	60 minutes	October 28, 2014	3302
Frontline investigates the miscalculations and mistakes behind the brutal rise of ISIS. Correspondent Martin Smith, who made "Truth, War & Consequences", "Beyond Baghdad", "Private Warriors" and "Gangs of Iraq", reports from Iraq on how the country began coming undone after the American withdrawal and what it means for the U.S. to be fighting there again.
638	4	Firestone and the Warlord	TBA	60 minutes	November 18, 2014	3303
Frontline and ProPublica investigate the relationship between Firestone and the infamous Liberian warlord Charles Taylor. Based on the inside accounts of Americans who ran the company's Liberia rubber plantation, and diplomatic cables and court documents, the investigation reveals how Firestone conducted business during the brutal Liberian civil war.
639	Special	Stickup Kid	Criminal Justice	28 minutew	December 17, 2014	3350
A FRONTLINE digital exclusive. Frontline explores what happens when a juvenile offender is sent to adult prison.

=== Season 33 (2015) ===
No. overall	No. in season	Title	Topic(s)	Running time	Original release date	Prod. code
640	5	Gunned Down: The Power of the NRA	Gun Control / Politics	60 minutes	January 6, 2015	3304
A look into the politics and power of the National Rifle Association
641	6	Putin's Way	Foreign Affairs / Defense	60 minutes	January 13, 2015	3305
An investigation into accusations surrounding Vladimir Putin's reign in Russia
642	7	Being Mortal	Medical Care	60 minutes	February 10, 2015	3306
An exploration into the intersection of life, death, medicine and what matters in the end.
643	8	The Vaccine War	Medical Care	60 minutes	March 24, 2015	2810
A continuation of Season 28's investigation into vaccine controversies, reviewing the latest chapter in the issue
644	9	The Fight for Yemen	Yemen Crisis	60 minutes	April 7, 2015	3319
A report by Safa Al Ahmad from the heart of the escalating conflict in Yemen
645	10	American Terrorist	David Headley	60 minutes	April 21, 2015	3307
Global surveillance disclosures (2013–present)
646	11	Outbreak	Medical Care	60 minutes	May 5, 2015	3308
The vivid, inside story of how the Ebola outbreak began, and why it wasn't stopped before it was too late.
647	12	The Trouble with Chicken	Health	60 minutes	May 12, 2015	3318
FRONTLINE investigates the spread of dangerous pathogens in our poultry, and why the food-safety system isn't stopping the threat.
648	13	Secrets, Politics and Torture	Foreign Affairs / Defense	60 minutes	May 19, 2015	3309
The dramatic story of the fight over the CIA's controversial interrogation methods, widely criticized as torture.
649	14	Obama at War	War and Conflict / World	60 minutes	May 26, 2015	3310
Inside the Obama administration's struggle to deal with ISIS and the deadly civil war in Syria.
650	15	Rape On The Night Shift	Criminal Justice / Immigration / Social Issues	60 minutes	June 23, 2015	3311
FRONTLINE investigates the sexual abuse of immigrant women in the janitorial industry.
651	16	Growing Up Trans	Family/Children	90 minutes	June 30, 2015	3301
An intimate look at the struggles and choices facing transgender kids and their families.
652	17	Escaping ISIS	Terrorism / World	60 minutes	July 14, 2015	3312
Gripping, first-hand accounts of women who escaped the brutal reign of ISIS.
653	18	Drug Lord: The Legend of Shorty	Joaquín 'El Chapo' Guzmán	60 minutes	July 21, 2015	3320
Two filmmakers set out to interview "El Chapo" Guzman, leader of a major Mexican drug cartel.
654 655 656	1 2 3	My Brother's Bomber (Parts 1,2,3)	Pan Am Flight 103	60 minutes	September 29, 2015 October 6, 2015 October 13, 2015	3313
In My Brother's Bomber, an emotional and suspenseful three-part series, Dornstein embarks on a quest for answers about the bombing of Pan Am Flight 103 over Lockerbie, Scotland.
657	4	Immigration Battle	Immigration / U.S. Politics	60 minutes	October 20, 2015	3316
Independent filmmakers take viewers behind closed doors in Washington's corridors of power to explore the political realities surrounding one of the country's most pressing and divisive issues.
658	5	Inside Assad's Syria	War and Conflict / World	60 minutes	October 27, 2015	3302
Correspondent Martin Smith goes Inside Assad's Syria to report from government-controlled areas as war rages, with on-the-ground reporting and firsthand accounts from Syrians caught in the crisis.
659	6	Terror in Little Saigon	Criminal Justice / World	60 minutes	November 3, 2015	3317
An investigation of a wave of terror that targeted Vietnamese-American journalists.
660	7	ISIS in Afghanistan	Islamic State of Iraq and the Levant – Khorasan Province	60 minutes	November 17, 2015	3318
Najibullah Quraishi reveals on film the degree to which ISIS is gaining a foothold in the country, and how they're focusing their efforts on training a new generation of jihadists.

=== Season 34 (2016) ===
No. overall	No. in season	Title	Topic(s)	Running time	Original release date	Prod. code
661	8	Netanyahu at War	International affairs	60 minutes	January 5, 2016	3404
A look at Israeli Prime Minister Benjamin Netanyahu's political career and his relationships with American presidents Bill Clinton and Barack Obama.
662	9	Supplements and Safety	Health	60 minutes	January 19, 2016	3403
An examination into the dangers of vitamins and supplements, including their production, use, and limited FDA oversight; produced with The New York Times and CBC Television's The Fifth Estate
663	10	The Fantasy Sports Gamble	Fantasy sports	60 minutes	February 9, 2016	3405
A joint investigation with The New York Times into the growth and operations of online daily fantasy sports operations
664	11	Chasing Heroin	Drug addiction	60 minutes	February 23, 2016	3406
An investigation into the heroin crisis in the United States
665	12	Saudi Arabia Uncovered	Middle East	60 minutes	March 29, 2016	3407
Undercover footage and on-the-ground reporting inside Saudi Arabia profiles those who seek to bring change to the kingdom.
666	13	Children of Syria	Middle East	60 minutes	April 19, 2016	3408
The story of four children surviving in war-torn Aleppo, Syria, and their escape to a new life in Germany.
667	14	Benghazi in Crisis Yemen Under Siege	Foreign affairs	18 minutes 35 minutes	May 3, 2016	3409
Benghazi in Crisis: A report from Benghazi, birthplace of Libya's 2011 uprising and the site of ongoing battles against ISIS. Yemen Under Siege: Journalist Safa al Ahmed looks at the human toll of the war in Yemen.
668	15	The Secret History of ISIS	Foreign affairs	60 minutes	May 17, 2016	3410
An examination of the creation of the Islamic State and the missed signs and missteps that led to its rise
669	16	Business of Disaster	Disaster relief	60 minutes	May 24, 2016	3411
A Frontline/NPR joint investigation into insurance company profits, fraudulent claims, and FEMA difficulties resulting from the cleanup after Hurricane Sandy
670	17	Policing the Police	Law enforcement	60 minutes	June 28, 2016	3412
Jelani Cobb's report from Newark, New Jersey highlights a look into the difficulties in reforming troubled police departments
671	Special	Mosquito Hunter	Health	12 minutes	August 2, 2016	Special
A look at Brazil's efforts to combat mosquito-borne illnesses, most notably Zika fever.
672	18	A Subprime Education	Education	60 minutes	September 13, 2016	3413
A look at allegations of fraud and predatory behavior plaguing the for-profit higher education industry.
673	1	The Choice 2016	Biographies	60 minutes	September 27, 2016	3501
A look at the backgrounds of presidential candidates Donald Trump and Hillary Clinton.
674	2	Confronting ISIS	Foreign affairs	60 minutes	October 11, 2016	3502
A look at the successes, failures and challenges in the U.S.-led effort to degrade and destroy ISIS.
675	3	Terror in Europe	Foreign affairs	60 minutes	October 18, 2016	3503
As Europe reels from a terror onslaught, top security officials describe their struggle to contain the unprecedented threat revealed by attacks in France and Belgium.
676	4	Exodus	Europe	120 minutes	December 27, 2016	3414
First-person accounts of refugees and migrants fleeing war and persecution for a safe haven in Europe.

=== Season 35 (2017) ===
No. overall	No. in season	Title	Topic(s)	Running time	Original release date	Prod. code
677	5	President Trump	Biographies	60 minutes	January 3, 2017	3504
The key moments in Donald Trump's life that lead to him becoming the 45th American president.
678 679	6 7	Divided States of America Parts 1 and 2	Government/Elections/Politics	120 minutes 120 minutes	January 17, 2017 January 18, 2017	3505 3506
A 2-part examination of the polarization dividing Washington and the U.S. as a whole begins with a look at how Barack Obama's promise of change and unity collided with racial and political realities.
680	8	Trump's Road to the White House	Biographies	60 minutes	January 24, 2017	3507
A look at how Donald Trump defied expectations to win the U.S. presidency, how he rallied millions of supporters and defeated adversaries, and who he's bringing with him to the White House.
681	9	Battle for Iraq Hunting ISIS	Foreign affairs/Defense	30 minutes 30 minutes	January 31, 2017	3508
Battle for Iraq: Reporter Ghaith Abdul-Ahad goes inside the battle against the Islamic State for control of the Iraqi city of Mosul. Hunting ISIS: A look at an elite special operations unit at the center of the fight against ISIS in Iraq.
682	Special	Betting on Trump: Water Betting on Trump: Coal Betting on Trump: Jobs	Economics	11 minutes 11 minutes 10 minutes	February 15, 2017	Special
A trio of reports from FRONTLINE, Marketplace and PBS NewsHour on what Donald Trump's promises mean to voters in California's Central Valley (farming and water), West Virginia (coal industry), and Erie, Pennsylvania (jobs)
683	10	Out of Gitmo Forever Prison	Foreign affairs/Defense	30 minutes 30 minutes	February 21, 2017	3509
Out of Gitmo: Frontline and NPR examines the struggle over freeing prisoners once deemed international terrorists. Forever Prison: A Frontline/Retro Report collaboration into the untold history of the Guantanamo Bay detention camp.
684	11	Iraq Uncovered	Iraq/war on terror	60 minutes	March 21, 2017	3516
A look into allegations of abuse of Sunni Muslim civilians by powerful Shia militias.
685	12	Last Days of Solitary	Criminal justice	60 minutes	April 18, 2017	3519
A look at Maine's ambitious attempt to decrease its use of solitary confinement and what happens when prisoners who have spent considerable time in isolation try to integrate back into society.
686	13	The Fish on My Plate	Health	90 minutes	April 25, 2017	3415
Writer Paul Greenberg spends a year on a diet almost exclusively of fish in pondering the question of what type of fish is good for the human body and the planet.
687	14	Second Chance Kids	Social issues	60 minutes	May 2, 2017	3511
Inside the fight over the fate of juveniles serving lifetime prison sentences for murder, 5 years after a landmark Supreme Court ruling that such sentences without the possibility of parole were unconstitutional.
688	15	Poverty, Politics and Profit	Housing	60 minutes	May 9, 2017	3512
A Frontline/NPR investigation into why, despite billions being spent on public/private housing initiatives, so few low-income people get the housing they need.
689	16	American Patriot	Law enforcement/Militias	60 minutes	May 16, 2017	3510
Inside the armed uprising against the federal government: how the Bundy family's uprising invigorated armed militias and "patriot" groups.
690	17	Bannon's War	Biographies	60 minutes	May 23, 2017	3513
A look at Trump adviser Steve Bannon; his confrontational style; his personal crusade to transform America; and his wars with radical Islam, traditional Washington politics, and rivals inside the White House.
691	18	Life on Parole	Criminal justice	60 minutes	July 18, 2017	3514
An inside look at an effort in Connecticut to change the way parole works and reduce the risk of recidivism, focusing on a quartet of former prisoners navigating the challenges of their first year on parole. (Reported in collaboration with The New York Times)
692	1	Abacus: Small Enough to Jail	Economics, Criminal justice	90 minutes	September 12, 2017	3517
The little-known story of the only U.S. bank prosecuted in relation to the 2008 financial crisis.
693	2	North Korea's Deadly Dictator	Biography/Foreign Affairs	60 minutes	October 4, 2017	3515
A look at who killed Kim Jong-nam and what his murder reveals about North Korea under the leadership of his half-brother, Kim Jong-un
694	3	War on the EPA	Government/Environment/Politics	60 minutes	October 11, 2017	3516
Inside Scott Pruitt's journey from his fight against the EPA to leading the agency and the recent history of the climate change policy of the United States
695	4	Mosul Inside Yemen	Foreign affairs/Defense	38 minutes 15 minutes	October 18, 2017	3601
Mosul: Inside the battle to drive the Islamic State out of Mosul. Inside Yemen: How Yemen's humanitarian crisis was worsened by a brutal war.
696 697	5 6	Putin's Revenge	Foreign affairs/Elections/Politics	60 minutes	October 25, 2017 (Part 1) November 1, 2017 (Part 2)	3602
A 2-part examination of Vladimir Putin's rise and rule of Russia, his grievances with the U.S., and accusations of Russian involvement in the 2016 U.S. presidential election.

=== Season 36 (2018) ===
No. overall	No. in season	Title	Topic(s)	Running time	Original release date	Prod. code
698	7	Exodus: The Journey Continues	Europe	120 minutes	January 23, 2018	3604
A sequel to Season 34's "Exodus" tells intimate stories of refugees and migrants caught in Europe's tightened borders.
699	8	The Gang Crackdown	Law enforcement	60 minutes	February 13, 2018	3605
An investigation into killings linked to the MS-13 gang and the law enforcement crackdown that led to some immigrant teens being unlawfully detained.
700	9	Bitter Rivals: Iran and Saudi Arabia	Foreign affairs	120 minutes 60 minutes	February 20, 2018 (Part 1) February 27, 2018 (Part 2)	3517
A 2-part look at how a dangerous political rivalry between Iran and Saudi Arabia has plunged the Middle East into sectarian war.
701	10	Weinstein	Sexual Harassment	60 minutes	March 2, 2018	3606
How Harvey Weinstein had allegedly sexually harassed and abused dozens of women over four decades and the elaborate ways he and those around him tried to silence his accusers.
702	11	Trump's Takeover	Politics	60 minutes	April 10, 2018	3607
How Donald Trump's use of inflammatory rhetoric and attacks on fellow Republicans gave him control of the GOP and further divided the country in his first year as U.S. President.
703	12	McCain	Biographies	60 minutes	April 17, 2018	3608
A look at John McCain's life and politics, including his time as a Vietnam POW, his 2008 run for U.S. President (and his selection of Sarah Palin as a running mate), and his complicated relationship with President Trump and fellow Republicans (including his dramatic vote against a GOP health care bill).
704	13	Trafficked in America	Law enforcement	60 minutes	April 24, 2018	3609
A labor trafficking investigation reveals a criminal network forcing Guatemalan teens to work against their will in Ohio.
705	14	Blackout in Puerto Rico	TBA	60 minutes	May 1, 2018	3610
An in-depth look why Puerto Rico was left struggling to survive after Hurricane Maria.
706	15	Myanmar's Killing Fields	Asia	60 minutes	May 8, 2018	3518
Secret footage going back years shows the effort to kill and expel Rohingya Muslims from Myanmar.
707	16	UN Sex Abuse Scandal	TBA	60 minutes	July 24, 2018	3611
An investigation into sex abuse by United Nations peacekeepers in the world's conflict zones.
708	17	Separated: Children at the Border	Immigration / Social Issues / U.S. Politics / World	60 minutes	July 31, 2018	3701
The inside story of what happened to immigrant children separated from their parents at the border.
709	18	"Documenting Hate: Charlottesville"	Criminal Justice / Social Issues / U.S. Politics	60 minutes	August 7, 2018	3613
In Documenting Hate: Charlottesville, FRONTLINE and ProPublica investigate the white supremacists and neo-Nazis involved in the 2017 Charlottesville Unite the Right rally.
710 711	19 20	Our Man in Tehran (Parts 1 & 2)	World	120 minutes 120 minutes	August 13, 2018 August 14, 2018	3614 3615
New York Times correspondent Thomas Erdbrink offers this 2-part revelation of life inside the closed society of Iran, where citizens lead their private lives and deal with the challenges of the country's conservative clerics and theocratic leaders.
712	1	Left Behind America	Business and Economy / Social Issues	60 minutes	September 11, 2018	3616
A look at the economic and social forces shaping Dayton, Ohio, a once-booming rust belt city hit hard by the Great Recession (nearly 35% of Dayton's residents live in poverty). (In partnership with ProPublica and WNET/New York's "Chasing the Dream" initiative)
713	2	Trump's Showdown	U.S. Politics	120 minutes	October 2, 2018	3702
Inside Donald Trump's fight against the investigation of his presidential campaign and whether he obstructed justice.
714	3	The Pension Gamble	Business and Economy / U.S. Politics	60 minutes	October 23, 2018	3703
How state governments and Wall Street led America's public pensions into a $4 trillion hole.
715 716	4 5	The Facebook Dilemma (Part One) The Facebook Dilemma (Part Two)	Business and Economy / Social Issues / U.S. Politics	60 minutes	October 29, 2018 October 30, 2018	3704 3705
Examining how Facebook created new problems for privacy and democracy despite repeated warnings
717	6	Documenting Hate: New American Nazis	Criminal Justice / Social Issues / Terrorism	60 minutes	November 20, 2018	3617
Follow-up to August 2018’s "Documenting Hate: Charlottesville". An investigation into white supremacist groups in America – in particular, a neo-Nazi group, Atomwaffen Division, that has actively recruited inside the U.S. military.

=== Season 37 (2019) ===
No. overall	No. in season	Title	Topic(s)	Running time	Original release date	Prod. code
718	7	Coal's Deadly Dust / Targeting Yemen	Climate and Environment / Health	60 minutes	January 22, 2019	3706
Frontline and NPR investigate the rise of severe black lung disease among coal miners, and the failure to respond. Also in this two-part hour, a report from Yemen.
719	8	Predator on the Reservation	Criminal Justice / Social Issues	60 minutes	February 12, 2019	3707
An investigation into the decades-long failure to stop a government doctor accused of sexually abusing Native American boys for years.
720	9	Right to Fail	Health / Social Issues	60 minutes	February 26, 2019	3709
Thousands of New Yorkers with severe mental illnesses won the chance to live independently in supported housing, following a 2014 federal court order. Frontline and ProPublica investigate what's happened to people moved from adult homes into apartments and find more than two dozen cases in which the system failed.
721	10	The Trial of Ratko Mladić	Criminal Justice / World	60 minutes	March 19, 2019	3618
Frontline's cameras go behind the scenes over five years during the trial of Ratko Mladić
722	11	The Mueller Investigation	Criminal Justice / U.S. Politics	60 minutes	March 22, 2019	3712
A special episode about the Special Counsel investigation led by Robert Mueller into the 2016 presidential election, aired following the submission of the investigators' final report to the Attorney General. (A co-production of Frontline and the PBS NewsHour)
723	12	Marcos Doesn't Live Here Anymore	Immigration / U.S. Politics	60 minutes	April 15, 2019	3710
In a special presentation from FRONTLINE, Independent Lens and VOCES, acclaimed filmmaker David Sutherland, examines the U.S. immigration system through two unforgettable protagonists whose lives reveal the human cost of deportation.
724	13	The Abortion Divide	Health / Social Issues / U.S. Politics	60 minutes	April 23, 2019	3708
Inside the fight over abortion, told through the stories of women struggling with unplanned pregnancies.
725	14	The Last Survivors	World	60 minutes	April 30, 2019	3711
FRONTLINE offers a haunting look at how disturbing childhood experiences and unimaginable loss have affected the daily lives and relationships of some of the Holocaust's youngest victims.
726	15	Trump's Trade War	International Relations / Economics / Trade	60 minutes	May 7, 2019	3801
The inside story of President Trump's confrontation with China over trade policy.
727	16	Supreme Revenge	U.S. Politics	60 minutes	May 21, 2019	3714
Inside the no-holds-barred war for control of the Supreme Court, and how a 30-year-old grievance transformed the high court and turned confirmations into bitter, partisan conflicts.
728	17	Sex Trafficking in America	Criminal Justice / Social Issues	60 minutes	May 28, 2019	3715
Sex Trafficking in America tells the unimaginable stories of young women coerced into prostitution – and follows one police unit that's committed to rooting out sexual exploitation.
729	1	Flint's Deadly Water	Climate and Environment / Criminal Justice / Health	60 minutes	September 10, 2019	3716
A look into the extent of a deadly Legionnaires' disease outbreak during the Flint water crisis.
730	2	The Crown Prince of Saudi Arabia	Foreign Affairs / International Relations	120 minutes	October 1, 2019	3802
The rise and rule of Crown Prince Mohammed Bin Salman of Saudi Arabia.
731	3	On The President's Orders	World	60 minutes	October 8, 2019	3719
A searing, on-the-ground look at President Rodrigo Duterte's deadly campaign against suspected drug dealers and users in the Philippines.
732	4	Zero Tolerance	Immigration / U.S. Politics	60 minutes	October 22, 2019	3803
How President Trump turned immigration into a powerful political weapon that fueled division and violence.
733	5	Fire In Paradise	Climate and Environment	60 minutes	October 29, 2019	3807
A look, one year later, into the devastating Camp Fire, the most destructive conflagration in California history, what caused the fire, and the impact of climate change.
734	6	In the Age of AI	Business and Economy / Social Issues / Technology	120 minutes	November 5, 2019	3805
A look into the promise and perils of artificial intelligence, from fears about work and privacy to rivalry between the U.S. and China.
735	7	Kids Caught in the Crackdown Iraq's Secret Sex Trade	Immigration Sex Crimes	27 minutes 27 minutes	November 12, 2019	3806
Kids Caught in the Crackdown: Frontline and The Associated Press investigate the mass confinement of migrant children, revealing traumatic stories of kids detained under President Trump's immigration policies. Iraq's Secret Sex Trade: A report on the sexual exploitation of women and girls in Iraq.
736	8	For Sama	World / War and Conflict	95 minutes	November 19, 2019	3717
In a time of conflict and darkness in her home in Aleppo, Syria, one young woman kept her camera rolling — while falling in love, getting married, having a baby, and saying goodbye as her city crumbled.

=== Season 38 (2020) ===
No. overall	No. in season	Title	Topic(s)	Running time	Original release date	Prod. code
737	9	Targeting El Paso	US Politics / Immigration	60 minutes	January 7, 2020	3804
El Paso, Texas became a testing ground for immigration policy — and then the target of a white supremacist.
738 739	10 11	America's Great Divide: From Obama to Trump (Parts 1 & 2)	U.S. Politics	115 minutes 114 minutes	January 13, 2020 January 14, 2020	3808 3809
A two-night (four-hour) Frontline special investigating America's increasingly bitter, divided and toxic politics. Part 1 traces how Barack Obama's promise of national unity collapsed as increasing cultural and political divisions laid the groundwork for the rise of Donald Trump. Part 2 examines how the country's political divisions led to Trump's successful 2016 presidential campaign, how his first presidency has unleashed anger on both sides of the divide, and what America's polarization could mean for the country's future.
740	12	Taliban Country The Luanda Leaks	World / War and Conflict / Terrorism	21 minutes 34 minutes	January 21, 2020	3810
Taliban Country: Reporter Najibullah Quraishi goes on a dangerous journey inside both Taliban- and ISIS-held territory in Afghanistan and reveals two harsh realities: The Taliban is once again wielding power, and the threat from ISIS looms large. The Luanda Leaks: How Africa's richest woman, Isabel dos Santos, built a business empire with access to Angolan state funds — and the role U.S. companies have played in helping her amass her fortune. (Reported in partnership with International Consortium of Investigative Journalists)
741	13	Battle for Hong Kong	World / Social Issues	60 minutes	February 11, 2020	3811
Unique inside access powers this profile of pro-democracy protesters during several months of violent protests against influence over Hong Kong by China's communist government.
742	14	Amazon Empire: The Rise and Reign of Jeff Bezos	Business and Economy	120 minutes	February 18, 2020	3812
How Jeff Bezos built Amazon into one of the most influential economic and cultural forces in the world, and how politicians and regulators are considering its global impact.
743	15	NRA Under Fire	US Politics	60 minutes	March 24, 2020	3813
The National Rifle Association's history and evolution, how it aligned with President Donald Trump and his base, and why it is under siege ahead of the 2020 United States elections.
744	16	Plastic Wars	Business and Economy / Climate and Environment	60 minutes	March 31, 2020	3814
A look into the fight over the use of plastics, the growing crisis of ocean pollution caused by plastic products, and whether the plastic industry used recycling to sell more plastic. (A joint investigation by Frontline and NPR with the American University School of Communication)
745	17	China Undercover	World	60 minutes	April 7, 2020	3818
An undercover report from China's secretive Xinjiang region profiles the Communist regime's mass imprisonment of Muslims and its use of surveillance technology against the Uyghur community.
746	18	Coronavirus Pandemic	Health / US Politics	60 minutes	April 21, 2020	3816
Miles O'Brien and Kate McMahon investigate how the United States responded to the COVID-19 pandemic, with a look into the first known case that was identified in the country.
747	19	Inside Italy's COVID War	World / Health / Social Issues	60 minutes	May 19, 2020	3819
Italian producer Sasha Achilli documents the struggle of doctors at the Maggiore di Cremona Hospital to combat the COVID-19 outbreak in Northern Italy.
748	20	The Virus: What Went Wrong?	US Politics / Health / Social Issues	90 minutes	June 16, 2020	3901
Martin Smith examines why different U.S. government officials, including the president, were slow to respond to the COVID-19 pandemic despite early warnings to prepare against the inevitable contagion.
749	21	Opioids, Inc.	Health / Social Issues	60 minutes	June 23, 2020	3815
How Insys Therapeutics bribed doctors and committed insurance fraud to secure prescriptions for a fentanyl-based opioid 50 times stronger than heroin. (Joint investigation with Financial Times)
750	22	Once Upon a Time in Iraq	War and Conflict	114 minutes	July 14, 2020	3817
Civilians, journalists, and soldiers from both sides of the conflict explain their experience during the Iraq War, from the 2003 invasion through the 17 years that followed.
751	23	COVID's Hidden Toll	Health / Social Issues	60 minutes	July 21, 2020	3818
An investigation into the plight of undocumented fieldworkers in California during the COVID-19 pandemic.
752	24	United States of Conspiracy	Politics / Social Issues	60 minutes	July 28, 2020	3902
How the likes of Alex Jones, President Donald Trump, and Trump confidant Roger Stone have propelled fringe conspiracy theories and misinformation into the mainstream American political dialogue.
753	25	Undocumented in the Pandemic Love, Life & the Virus	Health / Social Issues / Immigration	21 minutes 34 minutes	August 11, 2020	TBA
Twin segments that profile immigrant families in the United States during the COVID-19 pandemic: Undocumented in the Pandemic looks at one woman's struggle to keep her children safe and housed, while ICE detains her husband in a virus-ravaged facility. Love, Life & the Virus profiles another emigrant mother who gave birth after her COVID diagnosis, and the Connecticut schoolteacher who assisted her newborn and her family. (Both segments produced with The Marshall Project and Pulitzer Center)
754	1	Growing Up Poor in America	Business and Economy / Social Issues	54 minutes	September 8, 2020	3903
A look into how impoverished families are affected by the COVID-19 pandemic.
755	2	Policing the Police 2020	Social Issues	54 minutes	September 15, 2020	3904
Jelani Cobb follows up on his 2016 report Policing the Police with a look at the feasibility of police reform in the context of the George Floyd protests.
756	3	The Choice 2020: Trump vs. Biden	Election 2020 / U.S. Politics	120 minutes	September 22, 2020	3905
A look into the backgrounds of incumbent President Donald Trump and former Vice President Joe Biden, the two major candidates in the 2020 presidential election.
757	4	America's Medical Supply Crisis	Health	60 minutes	October 6, 2020	3906
How dealing with COVID-19 exposed cracks in America's medical supply chain and left healthcare workers scrambling for critical equipment. (Reported in partnership with Associated Press and Global Reporting Centre)
758	5	Whose Vote Counts	Elections	60 minutes	October 20, 2020	3820
Jelani Cobb reports on allegations of voter disenfranchisement in the leadup to the 2020 United States elections, how unfounded claims of voter fraud have entered the political dialogue, and how the COVID-19 pandemic could impact Election Day turnout. (An investigation with Columbia Journalism School, Columbia Journalism Investigations, and the USA Today Network)
759	6	American Voices: A Nation in Turmoil	COVID-19 / Election 2020 / Social Issues / U.S. Politics	54 minutes	November 17, 2020	3907
Filmed during much of 2020, this documentary looks at the lives, fears, and hopes of Americans in the chaotic months leading up to the election.
760	7	Supreme Revenge: Battle for the Court	U.S. Politics	TBA	November 24, 2020	3714
An updated version of Season 37's Supreme Revenge examines the bitter partisan war for the Supreme Court, and how it led to the controversial nomination and confirmation of Amy Coney Barrett in Fall 2020.
761	8	Return from ISIS	Terrorism / War and Conflict	TBA	December 15, 2020	3612
How an Indiana mother, with her children in tow, followed her Morocco-born husband into the Syrian heart of the self-declared ISIS caliphate, and what happened when the family returned to the United States.

=== Season 39 (2021) ===
No. overall	No. in season	Title	Topic(s)	Running time	Original release date	Prod. code
762	9	A Thousand Cuts	Social Issues / World	TBA	January 8, 2021	4001
Centering on Filipino journalist Maria Ressa, former CNN correspondent and co-founder of the news site Rappler, Ramona Diaz's documentary explores the conflicts between the press and the Philippine government under President Rodrigo Duterte.
763	10	President Biden	Election 2020 / U.S. Politics	TBA	January 19, 2021	3908
The key moments in Joe Biden's life that prepared him to become the 46th American president.
764	11	Trump's American Carnage	U.S. Politics	TBA	January 26, 2021	3910
An examination of how Donald Trump aggravated political divisions and stoked violence throughout his presidency, as well as how his party's leaders failed to heed the warning signs.
765	12	China's COVID Secrets	Health	84 minutes	February 2, 2021	3909
How China missed opportunities to suppress COVID-19 in the early days of the pandemic.
766	13	Iraq's Assassins Yemen's COVID Cover-Up	War and Conflict Health / War and Conflict	26 minutes 27 minutes	February 9, 2021	TBA
Iraq's Assassins: How Iranian-backed Shia militias are terrorizing Iraq; Yemen's COVID coverup: How the coronavirus pandemic has deepened Yemen's humanitarian crisis.
767	14	Death Is Our Business	Health / Social Issues	32 minutes	March 23, 2021	3720
At Black-owned funeral homes in New Orleans, COVID-19 has reshaped the grieving process.
768	15	American Insurrection	U.S. Politics / Social Issues	84 minutes	April 13, 2021	4002
In the aftermath of the 2021 storming of the United States Capitol, an investigation into how far-right extremist groups have evolved in the wake of the deadly Unite the Right rally — and the threat they pose today.
769	16	The Virus That Shook the World	COVID-19 / World	168 minutes	April 26, 2021	3913
The epic story of how people around the world lived through the first year of the COVID-19 pandemic, from lockdowns to funerals to protests.
770	17	Escaping Eritrea	World	54 minutes	May 4, 2021	3914
An unprecedented undercover investigation into one of the world's most repressive regimes — Eritrea.
771	18	The Healthcare Divide	Health / Business and Economy	54 minutes	May 18, 2021	3915
A joint investigation by Frontline and NPR into the growing inequities in American healthcare exposed by COVID-19.
772	19	The Jihadist	Terrorism / War and Conflict	54 minutes	June 1, 2021	TBA
Designated a terrorist by the United States, the powerful Syrian militant Ahmed al-Sharaa now seeks a new relationship with the West.
773	20	Germany's Neo-Nazis & the Far Right	Social Issues / World	54 minutes	June 29, 2021	4004
An investigation into the rise of far-right extremism and violence in Germany.
774	21	The Power of the Fed	Business and Economy / COVID-19	54 minutes	July 13, 2021	4005
As the U.S. Federal Reserve continues to pump billions of dollars into the financial system daily, who is benefiting and at what cost?
775	22	Leaving Afghanistan India's Rape Scandal	Terrorism / War and Conflict Social Issues / World	25 minutes 28 minutes	July 20, 2021	TBA
Leaving Afghanistan: FRONTLINE investigates the consequences of America's withdrawal from Afghanistan; India's Rape Scandal: FRONTLINE investigates a wave of shocking rape cases in India.
776	23	In the Shadow of 9/11	Criminal Justice / Terrorism	114 minutes	August 10, 2021	TBA
How seven men in Miami were indicted for the biggest alleged Al Qaeda plot since 9/11.
777	1	America After 9/11	Terrorism / U.S. Politics / War and Conflict / World	120 minutes	September 7, 2021	4008
How the American response to the terrorist attacks on September 11 reshaped the U.S.
778	2	Boeing's Fatal Flaw	Transportation	60 minutes	September 14, 2021	3916
An investigation into the design flaws, commercial pressures, and regulatory failures behind the Boeing 737 MAX.
779	3	Taliban Takeover	War and Conflict	60 minutes	October 12, 2021	TBA
A look at Afghanistan as the Taliban return to power following their 2021 offensive.
780	4	Pandora Papers Massacre in El Salvador	Business and Economy War and Conflict	30 minutes 30 minutes	November 9, 2021	4011
Pandora Papers: A massive leak of financial documents reveals the hidden assets and secret deals of the world's most wealthy and powerful. Massacre in El Salvador: The ongoing fight for justice for the El Mozote massacre.
781	5	Shots Fired	Social Issues	60 minutes	November 23, 2021	TBA
An investigation into the use of deadly force by police in Utah amid record police shootings.

=== Season 40 (2022) ===
No. overall	No. in season	Title	Topic(s)	Running time	Original release date	Prod. code
782	6	American Reckoning	History, race	84 minutes	February 15, 2022	4013-90
A retrospective look at race relations in the American South and the 1967 murder of Wharlest Jackson.
783	7	Putin's Road to War	Russia, War and Conflict, World	54 minutes	March 15, 2022	TBA
An examination of the events that shaped Russian president Vladimir Putin, the grievances that drive him, and how a growing conflict with the West exploded into war in Europe.
784	8	Pelosi's Power	U.S. Politics	84 minutes	March 22, 2022	4104
A look at House Speaker Nancy Pelosi's life and legacy, her political journey across three decades, and how she has faced challenges to her leadership and to American democracy.
785	9	Plot to Overturn the Election	Elections 2020 / U.S. Politics	54 minutes	March 29, 2022	4101
An expose into the sources of misinformation about the 2020 election, and how a few people have had a massive impact on the current crisis of democratic legitimacy in the U.S.
786 787 788	10 11 12	The Power of Big Oil: Part 1 – Denial The Power of Big Oil: Part 2 – Doubt The Power of Big Oil: Part 3 – Delay	Business and Economy / Climate and Environment / U.S. Politics	85 minutes 54 minutes 54 minutes	April 19, 2022 April 26, 2022 May 3, 2022	4015-90 4016 4017
Part One charts the fossil fuel industry's early research on climate change and investigates industry efforts to sow seeds of doubt about the science. Part Two explores the industry's efforts to stall climate policy, even as evidence about climate change grew more certain in the new millennium. As leading climate scientists issue new warnings about climate change, Part Three examines how the fossil fuel industry worked to delay the transition to renewable energy sources — including by promoting natural gas as a cleaner alternative.
789	13	Police on Trial	Law Enforcement / Social Issues	84 minutes	May 31, 2022	4012
A look at the aftermath of George Floyd's death, former police officer Derek Chauvin's trial and murder conviction, and ongoing struggles for police accountability and reform in Minneapolis.
790	1	Lies, Politics and Democracy	U.S. Politics	120 minutes	September 6, 2022	4103
How many in the Republican Party have embraced and enabled Donald Trump and his false claims of election fraud, and how their actions have undermined and threatened American democracy.
791	2	Michael Flynn's Holy War	Religion, Conservatism in the United States	55 minutes	October 18, 2022	4104
A look at how retired U.S. Army Lt. Gen. Michael Flynn went from fighting wars overseas to waging a "spiritual war" in America as a proponent of Christian nationalism and far-right conspiracy theories. (Reported in collaboration with Associated Press)
792	3	Putin's Attack on Ukraine: Documenting War Crimes	Russian invasion of Ukraine	84 minutes	October 25, 2022	4105-90
At look at "harrowing evidence" that links possible war crimes in Bucha to one of Russia's top generals — and possibly to Russian president Vladimir Putin — as well as the challenge of holding the Russian president and others in his chain of command to account. (Reported in collaboration with Associated Press)
793	4	Putin's War at Home	Russian invasion of Ukraine	54 minutes	November 1, 2022	4106
Inside stories of the activists and journalists risking arrest and imprisonment to protest and speak out about the Kremlin's war effort.
794	5	Crime Scene: Bucha After Zero Tolerance	Russian invasion of Ukraine Immigration	25 minutes 28 minutes	December 6, 2022	TBA
Crime Scene: Bucha: CCTV footage, intercepted phone calls, and 3D modeling trace the Russian-led massacre in Bucha. Reported in partnership with Associated Press) After Zero Tolerance: The story of a Honduran family's struggle to reunite after being separated at the Mexico-United States border three years earlier. (Reported in partnership with S.I. Newhouse School of Public Communications at Syracuse University and University of Connecticut)

=== Season 41 (2023) ===
No. overall	No. in season	Title	Topic(s)	Running time	Original release date	Prod. code
795 796	6 7	Global Spyware Scandal: Exposing Pegasus, Part 1: The List Global Spyware Scandal: Exposing Pegasus, Part 2: Fallout	Technology	60 minutes 60 minutes	January 3, 2023 January 10, 2023	4108 4109
A 2-part investigation into the Pegasus spyware and how it was used to hack into the files of journalists, activists, and the wife and fiancée of Saudi journalist Jamal Khashoggi. (Reported in partnership with Forbidden Films)
797	8	Putin and the Presidents	U.S.-Russian relations	55 minutes	January 31, 2023	4110
Vladimir Putin clashes with American presidents over five administrations as he tries to rebuild the Russian empire.
798	9	Age of Easy Money	Economy	115 minutes	March 14, 2023	4201-120
How the consequences surrounding the Federal Reserve's record pace of raising of interest rates in the face of high inflation and recession fears. (In partnership with WNET/New York's "Chasing the Dream" initiative)
799 801	10 12	America and the Taliban	Afghanistan/Pakistan	54 minutes 54 minutes 54 minutes	April 4, 2023 April 11, 2023 April 25, 2023	4111 4112 4113
A 3-part investigation into how America's 20-year investment in Afghanistan culminated in the Taliban regaining power, focusing on missteps and consequences.
802	13	Clarence and Ginni Thomas: Politics, Power and the Supreme Court	U.S. Supreme Court, Conservatism in the United States	114 minutes	May 9, 2023	4202-120
Michael Kirk examines how Supreme Court Justice Clarence Thomas and his wife, Ginni, have reshaped American law and politics.
803	14	Once Upon a Time in Iraq: Fallujah	Iraq War	54 minutes	May 23, 2023	4114
Soldiers, journalists, and ordinary Iraqis tell to James Bluemel the story of the First Battle of Fallujah, one of the defining episodes of the Iraq War.
804	15	After Uvalde: Guns, Grief & Texas Politics	School shootings, gun rights	54 minutes	May 30, 2023	4116
Maria Hinojosa examines the police response to the Robb Elementary School shooting, the fight over regulating assault rifles, and the struggle of Uvalde, Texas to heal one year after the tragedy. (Reported in partnership with Futuro Investigates and The Texas Tribune)
805	16	America's Dangerous Trucks	Transportation safety	54 minutes	June 13, 2023	4115
A FRONTLINE/ProPublica investigation into legal maneuvering, political influence, lax regulation, and industry opposition to measures that could reduce the risk of deadly accidents involving semi-trailer trucks (in particular those involving underride guards).
806	17	Inside the Iranian Uprising	Middle East	54 minutes	June 29, 2023	4117
Footage filmed by protestors augments this documentary look into the Mahsa Amini protests and the unprecedented pressure facing the Iranian government.
807	18	Putin's Crisis	Russia	52 minutes	July 11, 2023	TBA
The story of Vladimir Putin's rise to prominence, his clashes at home and abroad, and how the war against Ukraine has threatened his grip.
808	19	Two Strikes Tutwiler	Criminal Justice	20 minutes 34 minutes	September 5, 2023	4120
Two Strikes: How a troubled former West Point cadet got life in prison in Florida over an attempted carjacking. (Produced with The Marshall Project as part of FRONTLINE's fellowship with Firelight Media) Tutwiler: A window into the lives of incarcerated pregnant women and what happens to their newborns.
809	1	Putin vs. the Press	Media	53 minutes	September 26, 2023	TBD
A look at Nobel laureate Dmitry Muratov's fight to defend free speech and independent journalism in Russia.
810	2	The Astros Edge: Triumph and Scandal in Major League Baseball	Sports	84 minutes	October 3, 2023	4203-90
Reporter Ben Reiter examines the Houston Astros sign stealing scandal of the late 2010s and how it has affected the sport of baseball.
811	3	Elon Musk's Twitter Takeover	Social media	120 minutes	October 10, 2023	4204-120
How Elon Musk went from one of Twitter's most provocative users to its sole proprietor, and how his ownership of what he has rebranded "X" impacts both the company and free speech.
812	4	McConnell, the GOP and the Court	Supreme Court of the United States	54 minutes	October 31, 2023	4118
How Senate Republican leader Mitch McConnell helped transform the U.S. Supreme Court and American politics.
813	5–23e22	20 Days in Mariupol	Russian invasion of Ukraine	97 minutes	November 21, 2023	4122-90
A presentation of Mstyslav Chernov's film documenting how he and two colleagues were trapped in Mariupol, Ukraine during its siege by Russian forces. Plus, the winner for the Best Documentary Feature Film at the 96th Academy Awards.
814	6–23e5	Inside the Uvalde Response	Policing, Social Issues	114 minutes	December 5, 2023	4205
An examination of the Robb Elementary School shooting and the lessons learned from law enforcement's chaotic response. (Reported with ProPublica and The Texas Tribune)
815	7–23e6	The Discord Leaks	Technology, U.S. Politics	54 minutes	December 12, 2023	4206
816	8–23e7	Failure at the Fence / Netanyahu, America & the Road to War in Gaza	Israeli-Palestinian Conflict, U.S. Politics, War and Conflict, World	28 minutes,84 minutes	December 19, 2023	4207-120

=== Season 42 (2024) ===
No. overall	No. in season	Title	Topic(s)	Running time	Original release date	Prod. code
817	9–24e8	Israel's Second Front	Israeli-Palestinian Conflict, War and Conflict, World	54 minutes	January 23, 2024	4208
818	10–24e9	Democracy On Trial	Election 2020, U.S. Politics	144 minutes	January 30, 2024	TBD
819	11	Fractured	Criminal Justice, Fractured, Health, Local Journalism Initiative	28 minutes	March 5, 2024	TBD
820	12–24e11	Children of Ukraine	Ukraine, World	54 minutes	April 16, 2024	TBD
821	13–24e10	Documenting Police Use Of Force	Policing, Social Issues	54 minutes	April 30, 2024	4210
822	14–24e12	A Dangerous Assignment: Uncovering Corruption in Maduro's Venezuela	Journalism Under Threat, World	84 minutes	May 14, 2024	4212-90
823	1–24e2	Crisis On Campus	Israeli-Palestinian Conflict, Social Issues	53 minutes	June 11, 2024	4302
824	2–24e12	Two American Families 1991-2024	Business and Economy, Social Issues	113 minutes	July 23, 2024	4213-120
825	3–24e3	Germany's Enemy Within	World	53 minutes	July 30, 2024	4303
826	4–24e4	Biden's Decision	U.S. Politics	113 minutes	August 6, 2024	4304-120
827	5–24e1	South Korea's Adoption Reckoning	Social Issues, World	84 minutes	September 20, 2024	4301-90
828	6–24e5	The Choice 2024: Harris vs. Trump	U.S. Politics	114 minutes	September 24, 2024	4305-120
829	7–24e7	The VP Choice: Vance vs. Walz	U.S. Politics	54 minutes	October 8, 2024	4307
830	8–24e6	Year of War: Israelis and Palestinians	Israeli-Palestinian Conflict, War and Conflict, World	84 minutes	October 15, 2024	4306-90
831	9–24e7	American Voices 2024	U.S. Politics	86 minutes	October 29, 2024	4308-90
Frontline examines the shifting views and experiences of Americans from the 2020 U.S. election to now.
832	10–24e9	China, the U.S. & the Rise of Xi Jinping	China, World	114 minutes	November 26, 2024	4310
Frontline looks into Xi Jinping's rise to power and what that means for China, the U.S., and the world.
833	11–24e12	Breakdown in Maine	Local Journalism Initiative, Social Issues	54 minutes	December 10, 2024	4312
In partnership with the Portland Press Herald and Maine Public Radio, Frontline investigates Maine's deadliest mass shooting.

=== Season 43 (2025) ===
No. overall	No. in season	Title	Topic(s)	Running time	Original release date	Prod. code
834	1	Trump's Comeback	U.S. Politics	54 minutes	January 21, 2025	4311
Frontline examines Donald Trump's return to the White House with insider interviews and looks into defining moments in his career, including the 2020 election and felony convictions.
835	2	Battle for Tibet	China, World	54 minutes	February 18, 2025	4212
Frontline investigates China's rule of Tibet along with the succession battle for Tibet's spiritual leader, the Dalai Lama.
836	3	The Rise and Fall of Terrorgram	Social Issues, Technology, Terrorism	84 minutes	March 25, 2025	4310
In partnership with ProPublica, Frontline investigates how the online network Terrorgram spread extremism. The documentary examines how white supremacists utilize anonymous, loosely moderated social media platforms to promote terror attacks.
837	4	Alaska's Vanishing Native Villages	Climate and Environment, Social Issues	28 minutes	April 22, 2025	TBA
A look at the Alaska Native villages fighting for survival against climate change. With the Howard Center at ASU, FRONTLINE explores the challenges to preservation of traditions and why communities are relocating.
838	5	Antidote	Putin, journalist, wife	84 minutes	May 6, 2025	4316-90
Chronicles the lives of Christo Grozev, a Bulgarian investigative journalist whose reporting has exposed Russian spies, assassins, and those involved in the poisoning of opposition leader Alexei Navalny; and Evgenia Kara-Murza, the wife of Vladimir Kara-Murza, a prominent political activist who was poisoned twice and sentenced to 25 years in a Russian prison. Passion Pictures and Bellingcat Production for FRONTLINE in association with Impact Partners, Channel 4 and M4 Studio.
839	6	Hurricane Helene's Deadly Warning	Infrastructure, politics	54 minutes	May 20, 2025	4317
840	7	Syria's Detainee Files	War and Conflict	84 minutes	June 10, 2025	4402-90
841	8	Syria After Assad	War and Conflict	54 minutes	July 1, 2025	TBA
Martin Smith examines the fall of the 50 year old Assad dynasty and the future of the Syrian republic after Ahmad al-Sharaa's takeover of the country.
842	9	Trump's Power & the Rule of Law	U.S. Politics	84 minutes	July 15, 2025	4401-90
FRONTLINE examines the showdown between President Trump and the courts over the limits of presidential power.
843	10	Remaking the Middle East: Israel vs. Iran	War and Conflict	114 minutes	July 29, 2025	4405-90
FRONTLINE explores Israel's wars in Gaza and Iran — and U.S. involvement.
844	11	Born Poor	Poverty	84 minutes	October 7, 2025	TBA
FRONTLINE catches up with the kids from their 2017 report Poor Kids, following them as they grow to adults.
845	12	The Rise of RFK Jr.	Politics	114 minutes	October 21, 2025	4406
The dramatic and controversial rise of Robert F. Kennedy, Jr
846	13	The Rise of Germany's New Right	Politics	104 minutes	November 4, 2025	TBA
Frontline investigates how far-right leaders in Germany have risen to the brink of power
847	14	Drug War in Ecuador	Social issues	54 minutes	November 11, 2025	TBA
Frontline examines how a once-peaceful nation is now gripped by drug cartels, violence and a military crackdown.
848	15	2000 Meters to Andriivka	War & conflict	111 minutes	November 25, 2025	4408
A stunning portrayal of war in the trenches from the Oscar®-winning team behind 20 Days in Mariupol in a FRONTLINE and Associated Press collaboration
849	16	Status: Venezuelan/Surviving CECOT	Immigration	41/11 minutes	December 9, 2025	4407/TBD
Status Venezuelan tells the story of one Venezuelan family in Florida trying to stay together — and stay in the U.S. legally — as they navigate the shifting legal immigration landscape under the Trump administration’s policies. Surviving CECOT tells the story of 3 Venezuelan men branded as gang members and deported to CECOT
850	17	Strike on Iran: The Nuclear Question	War and Conflict	54 minutes	December 9, 2025	4410
Using rare on-the-ground access in Iran and in-depth forensic analysis, FRONTLINE, The Washington Post, Evident Media and Bellingcat conduct an immersive investigation of Iran’s nuclear program in the aftermath of the U.S. and Israeli strikes.

=== Season 44 (2026) ===
No. overall	No. in season	Title	Topic(s)	Running time	Original release date	Prod. code
851	1	Contaminated: The Carpet Industry's Toxic Legacy	Business and Economy	54 minutes	February 3, 2026	4411
How did PFAS chemicals once used in popular stain-resistant carpets end up in the water and environment in parts of Georgia, Alabama and South Carolina? FRONTLINE, The Associated Press, The Atlanta Journal-Constitution, The Post and Courier and AL.com investigate what happened with these forever chemicals and the ongoing health impacts.
852	2	Crisis in Venezuela	World	54 minutes	February 10, 2026	4412
What’s next for Venezuela after the dramatic fall of Nicolás Maduro? In a documentary from the filmmakers behind A Dangerous Assignment, FRONTLINE and The Associated Press investigate the legacy of corruption in Venezuela, the challenges to democracy, the conflict with the U.S., and the fight over who will control the oil-rich country.
853	3	The Deal: Trump, Bukele & the Gangs of El Salvador	Immigration	54 minutes	April 7, 2026	TBD
An examination of Salvadoran President Nayib Bukele’s deal with President Trump to imprison U.S. deportees, and what each leader stood to gain. FRONTLINE and the Salvadoran news outlet El Faro, now operating in exile, investigate Bukele’s tangled history with the gangs the U.S. says it is fighting.
854	4	Caught in the Crackdown	Immigration	54 minutes	April 14, 2026	TBD
FRONTLINE and ProPublica trace the violence, protests and arrests stemming from federal immigration sweeps across the United States. The documentary examines the tactics, legal cases and impact — from Los Angeles to Chicago to Minneapolis.
855	5	The President Vs. The Fed	Business and Economy	54 minutes	May 12, 2026	TBD
FRONTLINE examines President Donald Trump’s unprecedented attempts to assert control over the most powerful institution in the U.S. economy: the Federal Reserve.
856	6	The War Cabinet	U.S. Politics	84 minutes	May 26, 2026	TBD
The key players behind President Trump’s expansive use of the U.S. military. FRONTLINE examines the inner circle of advisors and officials trying to project U.S. power, from clashes with allies, to taking out foreign leaders, to waging war in the Middle East.
857	7	Baby Brokers	Business and Economy	54 minutes	June 23, 2026	TBD
Have lax laws left the for-profit adoption industry ripe for misconduct? FRONTLINE and Retro Report investigate how so-called baby brokers have targeted pregnant women and families looking to adopt, and an epicenter of the problem in Utah.
858	8	The Crown Prince & the President	U.S. Politics	84 minutes	June 30, 2026	TBD
FRONTLINE examines the alliance between Saudi Crown Prince Mohammed bin Salman and President Donald Trump. Based on more than 100 interviews done by correspondent Martin Smith, the documentary examines the forces binding the two men and their countries together, and what each stands to gain — from ambitions for a new Middle East, to arms deals, investments and personal profit.
859	9	Scammed	Business and the Economy	1 hr 23 minutes	September 29, 2026	TBD
FRONTLINE and The Associated Press investigate how online scams steal billions of dollars and ruin victims’ lives. The documentary traces the rise of a global criminal industry, the people and technology enabling it, and the efforts to shut it down.
860	10	American Voices	Social Issues	1 hr 23 minutes	October 13, 2026	TBD
Over the past six years, a team of filmmakers has been following more than a dozen Americans in eight states across the U.S., charting their views about changes in the country and in their own lives. How are these Americans — from a doctor to a pastor to a barber to a construction company owner to a retiree — feeling about the direction of the country as the midterms approach?
861	11	Haiti Deportation Crisis	Immigration	53 minutes	October 20, 2026	TBD
In 2026, as part of its immigration crackdown, the Trump administration ended an immigration program that provided temporary legal status for hundreds of thousands of Haitians who had fled violence and upheaval for the U.S. The administration said Haiti was now safe enough for them to return home. But what is the reality on the ground? With rare access, filmmakers Adam Desiderio and Sebastian Walker go inside Haiti in search of answers. The documentary offers a vivid, up-close look at the extent and impact of gang violence in Haiti, the efforts to combat it, and the rising fears among Haitians in the U.S. of being deported.
