= Bill Arnold (cinematographer) =

American cinematographer

- Occupation: Cinematographer
- Known for: The Farmer's Wife (1998); Country Boys (2006); Airline
- Notable work: Documentaries directed by David Sutherland

Bill Arnold is a cinematographer. His film credits include the David Sutherland award-winning documentary films The Farmer's Wife (1998) and Country Boys (2006). He was also the cinematographer for the American reality television series Airline. He has recently been working as a cinematographer with the Canadian television news magazine The Fifth Estate.

== Notable work ==
- The Farmer's Wife, the 1998 documentary film which won the 1999 New England Film & Video Festival (New England Spirit Award).
- Airline, the 2004 American television series which was nominated for a 2005 People's Choice Awards in the category of “Favorite Reality Show”.
- Country Boys, the 2006 documentary film which won the 2006 TCA Awards for Outstanding Achievement in News and Information

== Collaboration with David Sutherland ==
Arnold was one of five cinematographers credited on The Farmer's Wife, alongside Jim Morrissette, Joe Seamans, David Miers and Richard Chisolm. The documentary, a Frontline co-production with the Independent Television Service (ITVS), premiered on 21 September 1998 and follows a Nebraska farm couple's three-year struggle to save their farm and their marriage.

For the follow-up film Country Boys, which aired on Frontline from 9 to 11 January 2006, Arnold shared camera credits with Joe Seamans and David Miers. The film follows two students at the David School, an alternative high school in David, Kentucky,and its crew commuted to Kentucky throughout three years of principal photography Danny Greene, the school's founder, said the crew was respectful of the boys' lives, noting that cameras were sometimes placed far enough away that participants did not notice them.
