= Death of Harry Dunn =

Fatal road traffic collision resulting in UK/US diplomatic controversy

Coordinates: 51.9969593°N 1.1959241°W

- Date: 27 August 2019
- Time: 20:25 BST
- Location: B4031 road near RAF Croughton
- Cause: Road traffic collision
- Deaths: Harry Dunn
- Burial: 17 September 2019
- Inquiries: Northamptonshire Police
- Convicted: Anne Sacoolas
- Charges: Causing death by careless driving (convicted); Causing death by dangerous driving (acquitted)
- Sentence: 8 months in prison, suspended for 12 months, and disqualified from driving for 12 months

Harry Dunn was a 19-year-old British man who died following a head-on road traffic collision on 27 August 2019. He was riding his motorcycle near Croughton, Northamptonshire, near the exit to RAF Croughton, when a car travelling in the opposite direction and on the wrong side of the road collided with him. The car was driven by Anne Sacoolas, who was working for the United States Intelligence Community at the time of the collision; she is married to CIA employee Jonathan Sacoolas, stationed at the time at USAF listening station RAF Croughton. Sacoolas admitted that she had been driving the car on the wrong side of the road, saying that she made a mistake since she'd only been in the UK for 3 weeks and was not used to driving on the left side. The police said that, based on CCTV footage, they believed that to be true. Dunn was pronounced dead at the Major Trauma Centre of John Radcliffe Hospital, Oxford.

The collision caused diplomatic tension between British and US officials. Sacoolas fled Britain soon after the incident, and claimed diplomatic immunity with US support. Dunn's parents visited the White House on 15 October 2019 to meet with "a senior official" but, to their surprise, were met by President Donald Trump. On 20 October 2022, at the Old Bailey in London, Sacoolas pleaded guilty, via video link, to causing the death of Harry Dunn by careless driving. On 8 December 2022, she was sentenced to eight months imprisonment, suspended for 12 months, and disqualified from driving for 12 months. She had not attended the sentencing in person on the advice of the US government, despite the request of the judge.

An independent review, published on 18 June 2025, criticised the senior leadership of Northamptonshire Police for their handling of the case, with a following statement from Assistant Chief Constable Emma James apologising to Dunn's family. On 19 June the family submitted a formal complaint over the conduct of former Chief Constable Nick Adderley for multiple failures, including giving inaccurate public statements about the legal immunity of Sacoolas.

== Collision ==
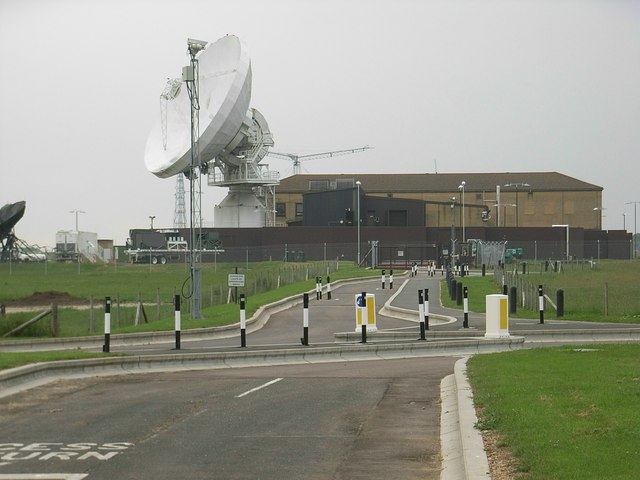
RAF Croughton in 2007

Harry Dunn, a 19-year-old resident of Charlton near Banbury, was riding his motorcycle on the B4031 road about 400 yards (370 m) from the exit of RAF Croughton on the evening of 27 August 2019, when he was struck by a car. The car was driven by Anne Sacoolas, who was then a member of the United States Intelligence Community and the wife of a CIA operative working at the United States Air Force listening station at RAF Croughton. Police said they believed the car, a right-hand-drive Volvo XC90, had been driven on the wrong side of the road from the base exit, which Sacoolas later admitted.

Sacoolas had a previous driving infraction in the US state of Virginia in 2006 for "failing to pay full time and attention". The BBC reported that the Sacoolas family had been in Britain for three weeks prior to Dunn's death.

Call handlers for the emergency telephone call categorised Dunn's injuries as category 2, requiring ambulance attention within 40 minutes; the ambulance arrived 43 minutes after the collision. The chief executive of East Midlands Ambulance Service later said that the categorisation did not make a difference to the outcome because of a shortage of ambulance crews. Dunn was pronounced dead at the Major Trauma Centre of the John Radcliffe Hospital, Oxford.

== Investigation ==
An investigation into the collision led by Nick Adderley, the chief constable of Northamptonshire Police, determined, from CCTV records, that a car had been travelling on the wrong side of the road. Sacoolas had cooperated with police at the scene of the crash and was breathalysed. She was interviewed the next day at home and the police said she had cooperated with them. She had said she was driving on the wrong side of the road when she collided with Dunn. Diplomatic immunity was mentioned during the interview, and Northamptonshire Police applied for an immunity waiver later that day.

On 14 September, Foreign Office diplomat Neil Holland texted a US official that "It's obviously not us approving of their departure", but that, since the US was not waiving immunity, "I think you should feel able to put them on the next flight out". The Telegraph reported that Sacoolas left the country on a 'private' flight which likely took off from the US airbase at Mildenhall.

Adderley later confirmed that the suspect was to be interviewed under caution in the United States, at her own request, explaining: "A file of evidence has been handed to the Crown Prosecution Service (CPS) but ... that file is incomplete – you can't complete the file until you have an account from the suspect." On 31 October, police confirmed they had interviewed the suspect and passed the information to the CPS.

Following the police interview with Sacoolas, Dunn's mother told Sky News that the family were frustrated by the lack of progress and information, and objected to the decision to interview Sacoolas in the US. On 1 November, the police submitted a file to the CPS, who would evaluate it for a charging decision.

== Diplomatic issues ==
The collision became the subject of a diplomatic dispute when Sacoolas left the country shortly after the incident and the US embassy said she had diplomatic immunity as the wife of a US agent working in the UK. According to Sky News, someone at the US embassy told Sacoolas to leave the UK. The Washington Examiner reported that Jonathan Sacoolas did not work for the National Security Agency, and that the Sacoolas family lived in Northern Virginia in the area of the Central Intelligence Agency Langley headquarters.

Dunn's parents were advised by two leading specialist lawyers on diplomatic immunity, Mark Stephens and Geoffrey Robertson. They advised that Anne Sacoolas was not entitled to diplomatic immunity, as her husband was not listed as a diplomat. Furthermore, they contended, diplomatic immunity no longer applied upon Sacoolas's return to her home country; therefore, it would be possible to take civil action in the US courts. The foreign secretary, Dominic Raab, also stated that diplomatic immunity no longer applied. Dunn's parents decided to travel to the US to "fight for change" and seek the return of Sacoolas to the UK.

President Donald Trump's briefing notes were revealed in a photograph taken at a 10 October press conference. If asked the US line was to say that Anne Sacoolas would not return to the UK, despite the previous intervention of Raab and the Prime Minister, Boris Johnson, which had included a call to the president. In response, Dunn's mother said that the position of the US was "beyond any realm of human thinking", adding "I'm just disgusted. I don't see the point in Boris Johnson talking to President Trump, or President Trump even taking a call from Boris Johnson. If he'd already made his decision that if it were to be asked and if it were to be raised, the answer was already going to be no."

=== Parents' meeting with Trump ===
Dunn's parents visited the White House on 15 October 2019 to meet with "a senior official". To their surprise they were met by President Trump, who told them that Sacoolas was waiting "in the next room" to meet them. They and their lawyer rejected this as being too soon, and something that should take place on British soil. Trump called his meeting with the Dunn family "beautiful in a certain way". He also said driving on the wrong side "happens to a lot of people", because they "go to Europe and the roads are opposite". It was later alleged that Trump had intended to pay the family compensation, but they refused it: the Dunn family's spokesman reported that the White House meeting ended with the president saying the Secretary of the Treasury, Steven Mnuchin, was "standing by ready to write a cheque", adding: "It was almost as if he let it slip out. When he said: 'We've got the driver [Sacoolas] here', he basically meant we're all going to have a big hug and a kiss and I'll get my treasury guy to write a cheque. That's how it was. On the day it just didn't register with me, but the more I think about those words, the more shocking it is."

== Responses by parents and others ==
On 15 October 2019, the Dunn family announced their intention to start a judicial review action into the advice given by the FCO to Northamptonshire Police regarding the diplomatic immunity of Anne Sacoolas and set up a CrowdJustice web page. Three days later, Dunn's parents said that they expected UK police to charge Sacoolas in connection with their son's death. On the same day it was reported that the Foreign Office had asked Northamptonshire Police to withhold informing the family of Sacoolas' flight to the US, "for a day or two". The Dunn family became aware that Anne Sacoolas had left the UK one week later, on 23 September. Subsequently, a review of the diplomatic immunity arrangements at RAF Croughton was commissioned.

Nigel Farage discussed the case with Trump by telephone, on his 1 November LBC evening talk-show. Trump said that Sacoolas had a "compelling story to tell" when he met her at the White House. Asked if there were circumstances where Sacoolas could return to the UK to face charges, Trump said: "Well, I would have to see what the final facts are ... And, I'll take a look at the final facts. She's represented by a lawyer."

On 21 November, Dunn's parents expressed their disgust with Raab, who had defended the government's decision to seek legal costs. The Foreign and Commonwealth Office said there was not "any reasonably arguable ground of legal challenge" in a legal case Dunn's parents were bringing against them. On 25 November, Dunn's father, together with a group of more than 50 others, were, for fire safety reasons, prevented by staff from entering a hustings attended by Raab in East Molesey Methodist Church.

Dunn's parents sought leave to bring a judicial review on 25 November, detailing the Foreign Secretary's actions over the extension of diplomatic immunity to intelligence staff and families at RAF Croughton. They stated that UK–US "secret treaties" had been disclosed but the documents did not cover immunity for family members. An FCO spokesman commented "As the Foreign Secretary set out in Parliament, the individual involved had diplomatic immunity whilst in the country under the Vienna Convention on Diplomatic Relations." The Archbishop of Canterbury Justin Welby wrote to the US ambassador in London early in October, asking that the extradition of Anne Sacoolas should not be blocked, but had at the time not received a reply.

In December, Dunn's parents announced they were to file a civil lawsuit in Virginia, where Sacoolas lived, seeking to compel her to return to the UK. Their lawyer referenced English common law which, they asserted, allowed offences committed in one country to be the subject of charges laid in another. In January 2020, a protest meeting was held at RAF Croughton. Dunn's family said they would continue their demonstration until, "the US government agrees not to abuse their power again".

== Criminal prosecution and civil litigation ==
In December 2019, the Crown Prosecution Service announced that Sacoolas was to be charged with causing death by dangerous driving and that it was starting extradition proceedings against her. Sacoolas's lawyer Amy Jeffress said: "Anne will not return voluntarily to the UK to face a potential jail sentence for what was a terrible but unintentional accident", adding, "the potential 14-year sentence was not proportionate." The Dunn family later met with the Home Secretary, Priti Patel, and their MP, Andrea Leadsom, at their home. Their family spokesman said they were now "incredibly reassured this whole saga will be dealt with under the rule of law".

The following January, the Home Office formally requested the extradition of Sacoolas to face charges in the United Kingdom. The US State Department's initial response was "The use of an extradition treaty to attempt to return the spouse of a former diplomat by force would establish an extraordinarily troubling precedent" and that the request was "highly inappropriate". On 23 January, US Secretary of State Mike Pompeo formally rejected the request for extradition. The family spokesman said they had taken the news "in our stride". The Home Office said the decision appeared "to be a denial of justice". Andrea Leadsom was planning to meet the US ambassador, Woody Johnson, in London on 24 January to discuss the case.

In January 2020 Northamptonshire Chief Constable Nick Adderley requested an urgent meeting with the commander of the military base after footage emerged of another vehicle on the wrong side of the road near RAF Croughton. Officers gave details of a separate crash, in October, in which a police vehicle had been struck by a car being driven on the wrong side of the road.

The Mail on Sunday disclosed the following month that Sacoolas was previously involved in espionage with the CIA. Following the disclosure, which was subsequently confirmed by Sky News, and widely reported by other news outlets, Dunn's mother expressed her family's suspicions that the British government were not fully sharing their knowledge of Sacoolas's past role with them. The Times speculated that the prime minister would come under more pressure to meet the Dunn family. The Times also suggested that the disclosure could lead to allegations that the US were giving Sacoolas special protection because of her past activities with the CIA.

The Dunn family urged the British government to refuse the US government's extradition request of Wikileaks founder Julian Assange until they returned Sacoolas to the UK. They accused the US government of hypocrisy and said that the US had launched an attack on the Special Relationship between both countries.

On 18 June 2020, a preliminary hearing of the judicial review brought by the Dunn family took place at the High Court of Justice. In a submission to the court Tony Baldry, former Foreign and Commonwealth Office minister and signatory to the diplomatic immunity agreement covering the base at which Sacoolas' husband worked, stated that the agreement was "limited" and did not cover dependants. In a further submission Sir Ivor Roberts, a former longstanding diplomat, called the claim that Sacoolas was covered by diplomatic immunity "a palpable absurdity". An adjournment debate on RAF Croughton, in the House of Commons, was led by local Member of Parliament Andrea Leadsom, who focused on Dunn's death and called for the government to intervene and block plans to modify the airbase. As of August Suella Braverman, the Attorney General for England and Wales, was considering trying Sacoolas in absentia on a charge of causing death by dangerous driving. The prospect of a virtual trial, an option being considered by the attorney general, received support from the prime minister, Boris Johnson.

On 9 September 2020, a lawsuit for wrongful death was filed against Sacoolas and her husband in a Virginia federal court. A legal representative of the Dunn family stated: "Given Ms Sacoolas' refusal to return to the UK, we look forward to bringing this case to a jury of Anne Sacoolas' peers here in the United States." The lawsuit alleges that Sacoolas did not notify the emergency services or police after the accident. On the same day, the Dunn family met with the Director of Public Prosecutions, Max Hill QC, after which it was reported that Hill had concluded that Sacoolas did not have diplomatic immunity and should not have been permitted to leave the country. However, a High Court ruling on 24 November 2020 concluded Sacoolas did have diplomatic immunity at the time of Dunn's death.

The Virginia court held a hearing for the case against Sacoolas in February 2021. It was revealed in the court that Sacoolas was an employee of the CIA. This raised doubts about her claim for diplomatic immunity because it would not apply to any US administrative or technical staff under an agreement between the UK and the US in 1995.

When asked why she had refused to return to the UK, Sacoolas's lawyer told the court: "Her fear is that with the tremendous media attention she will receive, she's concerned she will not receive fair treatment with the press and the local community. She is fearful upon her return and concerned, and she's certainly apologetic and accepts full responsibility for causing this accident." The presiding judge T. S. Ellis III replied: "Accepting full responsibility doesn't mean you run away, it means you stay there and face it. You shouldn't overplay the full responsibility card."

On 16 February 2021 Ellis ruled that Dunn's family would be able to sue Sacoolas for damages, dismissing her argument that holding the proceedings in the UK would be "more convenient". Handing down his judgment, Ellis said: "While it is commendable that defendant Anne Sacoolas admits that she was negligent and that her negligence caused Harry Dunn's death, this does not equate acceptance of responsibility. ... Full acceptance of responsibility entails facing those harmed by her negligence and taking responsibility for her acts where they occurred, in the United Kingdom." Ellis said he had also considered the "firm support" for the Dunns expressed by the Foreign Secretary Dominic Raab. Other motions, submitted by Sacoolas's legal team to dismiss the case, would be heard in Virginia on 3 March.

In March 2021, Sacoolas's lawyer Amy Jeffress said that, since the charge pending in Britain against her would not usually result in a prison sentence in the US, her client was not inclined to return to the UK to face trial. Jeffress also said that her client would be willing to undertake community service in the US and make a "contribution" in his memory, as well as meet his family. In reply, Dunn's mother said Sacoolas must face "the UK justice system". Jeffress also rejected claims that Sacoolas had not sought assistance, saying that she had stopped a passing driver and asked them to call for an ambulance, while she had contacted police at RAF Croughton.

On 8 August 2021, the BBC reported that the Dunn family lawyer had submitted documents to the US court alleging that Sacoolas may have been distracted by her mobile phone at the time of the crash, stating that there were call and text records for the day before and the day after, but no call records or text messages for that day, with the submission suggesting that "relevant phone data was deleted."

In September 2021, the family's spokesman announced that their civil claim for damages had been resolved, which he described as "a real milestone". Details of the agreement were not published. The spokesman said the family would now turn its "attention to the criminal case and the long-awaited inquest into Harry's death which will follow the criminal case".

On 13 December 2021, the CPS announced that Sacoolas would appear via video link at Westminster Magistrates' Court on 18 January 2022. Her lawyers denied this, claiming that no agreement for her to do so had been reached. The January date was later postponed to allow further liaison with her legal team. On 22 March 2022, MP Andrea Leadsom raised a topical question in Parliament to ask Dominic Raab to give an update on what was being done to deliver justice.

A new court date of 29 September 2022 was announced a few days before it was due to take place. On 29 September Sacoolas appeared by video link during the six-minute hearing, speaking only to confirm her date of birth and name. The chief magistrate Paul Goldspring agreed that her lawyer's address, rather than hers, could be used for correspondence. Sacoolas was told to attend the next hearing, at the Old Bailey, in October, in person or apply for permission to use a video link.

On 20 October 2022, the Old Bailey heard and accepted Sacoolas's plea of guilty (via video link) to the charge of causing death by careless driving. She had pleaded not guilty to the more severe offence of causing death by dangerous driving. On 8 December, Sacoolas was sentenced by Mrs Justice Bobbie Cheema-Grubb to eight months in prison, suspended for 12 months, and was disqualified from driving for 12 months. She had not attended the sentencing in person on the advice of the US government despite the request of the judge.

At the inquest, held at Northampton Coroners' Court in June 2024, Sacoolas was absent but supplied two new statements. The inquest also heard her responses during a police interview two months after the fatal crash and a statement from her lawyers in 2020. The inquest heard that, when asked what she believed had caused the collision, she told Northamptonshire Police officers: "I drove like an American and drove on the American side of the road." She said in her statement to the inquest: "I deeply regret having caused this accident. I made a tragic mistake that I will live with every single day for the rest of my life. There is not a single day that goes by that Harry is not on my mind and I am deeply sorry for the pain that I have caused."

An independent review, published on 18 June 2025, criticised the senior leadership of Northamptonshire Police for their handling of the case. Following the report, a statement from Assistant Chief Constable Emma James was issued saying: "On behalf of Northamptonshire Police, I want to apologise to Harry's family for what is now clear was a failure on our part to do the very best for the victim in this case, Harry, and his family who fought tirelessly in the years that followed to achieve justice for him." On 19 June, Dunn's family submitted a formal complaint over the conduct of former Chief Constable Nick Adderley for multiple failures, including giving inaccurate public statements about the legal immunity of Anne Sacoolas.

== Diplomatic immunity for RAF Croughton staff and families ==
On 21 October 2019 the British Foreign Secretary, Dominic Raab, claimed that according to "arrangements" between the US and the UK in 1995, the spouses and children of US intelligence officers at RAF Croughton were considered part of the US embassy and thus eligible for diplomatic immunity under the terms of the Vienna Convention, even though the officers themselves were deemed ineligible to claim diplomatic immunity for criminal behaviour outside the base. The accuracy and legal validity of this claim has been strongly challenged by others.

On 22 July 2020 it was widely reported that the UK and US governments had agreed to close the "loophole" in the arrangement that allegedly provided immunity from criminal prosecution for the family of US staff (though not retroactively). The precise legal nature of those arrangements, however, remains unexplained. The US State Department said the amendment was a "reflection of our especially close relationship" with the UK. The Shadow Foreign Secretary, Lisa Nandy, said that Labour would "push for a full inquiry" into the case.

== Legacy ==
Dunn's funeral took place on 17 September 2019, followed by cremation at an Oxfordshire crematorium.

In December 2022, Dunn's family welcomed major changes to road safety outside US bases in the UK, announced in a letter to them from the Transport Secretary. Mark Harper wrote to the Dunn family, promising to implement several recommendations, following a review of safety around both RAF Croughton and RAF Barford St John in Oxfordshire. The road from RAF Croughton to Croughton village was given clear road markings directing drivers to stay in the left lane.

In December 2023, Dunn's family said that something had gone "very badly wrong" after another US citizen had been able to evade British justice after alleged involvement in a road accident. Issac Calderon, a US citizen described as "associated with the secret service", had reportedly left the UK days before a court appearance. The car crash, at Shucknall Hill, Herefordshire, had left nurse Elizabeth Donowho unable to walk for six weeks. Family lawyer Radd Sieger said that road incidents involving US citizens "happen all the time". He noted remarks made by Conservative MP David Mellor in 1983, who said 2,000 US servicemen had been convicted for traffic offences in the previous year. In August 2024, it was announced that, after losing an appeal in a US court, Calderon would be extradited to the UK to face charges, as the court had "probable cause" to believe he had committed offences in the UK. In November 2024 Calderon was sentenced, at Worcester Crown Court, to 32 months in jail.

In June 2025 Charlotte Charles, Dunn's mother, was appointed a Member of the Order of the British Empire (MBE) in the King's Birthday Honours, for services to road safety.

== See also ==
- Killing of Jennifer Laude, 2014
- Raymond Allen Davis incident, 2011
- Teo Peter, 2004
- Yangju highway incident, 2002
- Yumiko-chan incident, 1955
- Ridge Alkonis, 2021
