= CrowdJustice =

Crowdfunding platform for legal cases

- Website type: Crowdfunding (Social business)
- Founder: Julia Salasky
- Website: www.crowdjustice.com
- Launched: 2014; 12 years ago

CrowdJustice is a commercial crowdfunding platform in the United Kingdom and the United States for projects aimed at improving access to the legal system. It was founded in 2014 by Julia Salasky.

== Overview ==
CrowdJustice is a crowdfunding platform designed for raising funds for legal cases by individuals, communities, or organizations. The platform employs a team of legal advisors who assess individual campaigns to evaluate each campaign to ensure a qualified lawyer has been engaged for that campaign and that all funds go to the lawyer’s client trust account. CrowdJustice states that they take on both private and public campaigns. Initially established in the United Kingdom in 2014, CrowdJustice expanded to the United States in 2017, concurrently relocating its headquarters from London to New York City.

Campaigns charge donors only if they reach a minimum funding threshold. In 2015, CrowdJustice announced a commission rate of 5% for the cases it supports. The company raised $2 million in 2017 in a seed round of funding led by Venrock and First Round Capital, which facilitated its expansion into the U.S. market.

== Notable legal cases ==
=== United Kingdom ===
Funded in 2015, Jengba (Joint Enterprise: Not Guilty by Association) raised £10,145 to intervene in a Supreme Court of the United Kingdom case on the law of joint enterprise in 2016. It was also the first crowdfunded case brought before the UK Supreme Court.

In 2016, the “People’s Challenge” to Brexit campaign raised £170,550 with 4,918 pledges. Once funded, this campaign brought a successful legal challenge to Brexit in 2017 to the Supreme Court of the United Kingdom resulting in the court determining an act of Parliament was necessary to trigger any final action.

In January 2017, the advocacy group Liberty launched a campaign to raise funds to challenge the Investigatory Powers Act in the High Court, raising more than £53,000 in a week. In April 2018, the High Court issued its ruling on the first part of the challenge, giving the government six months to rewrite core parts of the Act, which it found incompatible with EU law. Liberty's challenge to various parts of the Investigatory Powers Act is ongoing; in May 2018, they completed a second crowdfunded campaign to support their challenge.

In January 2018, the Centre for Women's Justice crowdfunded on behalf of two women who were raped and sexually assaulted by John Worboys for a judicial review against the Parole Board and the Secretary of State for Justice (SSJ) to challenge the decision to grant Worboys parole. By November 2018, the Parole Board had reversed its decision, and Nick Hardwick, the parole board chair, was forced to resign. The Centre for Women's Justice has gone on to crowdfund multiple cases on CrowdJustice. In June 2019, the Centre for Women's Justice launched two fundraising campaigns to bring two different judicial reviews against the Crown Prosecution Service (CPS). In the first campaign, they are representing the End Violence Against Women Coalition (EVAW) to challenge alleged CPS covert policy changes that are blamed for a collapse in the number of rape cases going to court. In the second, on behalf of Emily Hunt, they challenged how the CPS regards voyeurism in private settings under the Sexual Offences Act 2003.

=== United States ===
The week CrowdJustice launched in the United States, the Legal Aid Justice Center (LAJC) created a campaign on behalf of green card holders Tareq Aqel Mohammed Aziz and Ammar Aqel Mohammed Aziz who were initially trapped at Dulles Airport due to a 2017 executive order. The Aziz brothers were in the air when the executive order went into effect and detained upon arrival. The LAJC filed suit in Virginia, independent from similar cases filed by the ACLU. Over a nine day period, the Aziz brothers were sent back to Ethiopia and then to Djibouti before being allowed to return and enter the United States.

In September 2015, OneVirginia2021 filed a lawsuit asking to have 11 different Virginia House of Delegates and Senate districts be redrawn due to allegations of gerrymandering. In February 2017, the non-profit organization started to crowdfund on CrowdJustice in order to raise $5,000 for the case. Ultimately, they raised $51,423 from 1,068 donors to support their lawsuit. In May 2018, the Supreme Court of Virginia rejected the challenge to the state's 2011 redistricting process and found the districts to be constitutionally valid.

The organization Equally American (formerly We the People Project) brought a lawsuit to challenge the prohibition on residents of U.S. territories voting in federal elections in February 2017. This was the second U.S. case on CrowdJustice.

In March 2018, Stormy Daniels and her lawyer, Michael Avenatti, launched a campaign on CrowdJustice to raise funds for her legal case to invalidate a nondisclosure agreement she signed with Michael Cohen in October 2016. The campaign raised $587,415 with 16,862 donors. In November 2018, Avenatti launched a second CrowdJustice campaign to raise additional funds for Daniels. However, Daniels publicly stated that she did not authorize the campaign and CrowdJustice soon pulled it from their website. CrowdJustice also launched an investigation into another campaign (to help families at the Mexican border) created by Avenatti. This campaign was not pulled from their website.

== See also ==
- Comparison of crowdfunding services
- GoFundMe
