= Ridge Alkonis =

American naval officer convicted for a fatal car crash in Japan

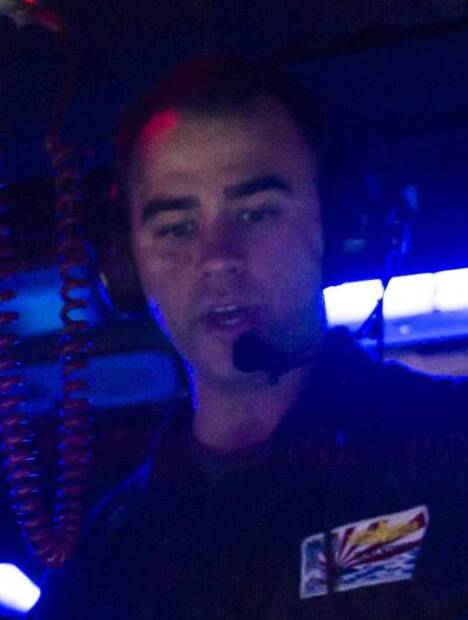
- Alkonis in 2015
- Born: Ridge Alkonis; April 10, 1988 (age 38); United States
- Spouse: Brittany Alkonis
- Military career
- Branch: United States Navy
- Service years: 12.5
- Rank: Lieutenant
- Criminal information
- Status: Unconditionally released on January 12, 2024
- Convictions: Negligent driving resulting in death and injury
- Penalty: 3 years in prison

Details
- Date: May 29, 2021
- Locations: Shizuoka Prefecture, Japan
- Killed: 2
- Injured: 3

Ridge Hannemann Alkonis (born April 10 1988) is a former United States Navy lieutenant whose imprisonment in Japan became a political issue. In 2021, Alkonis was involved in a vehicle accident that left two others dead. He was convicted of negligent driving and sentenced to three years in prison, with the judgement being upheld upon appeal. The Biden administration worked diplomatically to free him, and several members of the United States Congress criticized the Japanese justice system. After only a year of imprisonment in Japan, Alkonis was transferred to US custody and paroled unconditionally shortly after.

The Alkonis case strained bilateral ties between the United States and Japan.

== Incident and aftermath ==
=== Crash and trial ===
On May 29, 2021, Alkonis was driving his wife and three children back from a day trip to Mt. Fuji. He fell asleep behind the wheel and drifted across the oncoming traffic lane and into a restaurant parking lot, crashing into several parked vehicles and pedestrians. A Japanese family of four, an elderly couple along with their daughter and son-in-law, were celebrating the mother's birthday at the restaurant. The 85-year-old mother and the 54-year-old son-in-law died as a result of this crash, while the daughter of the 85-year-old (who was also the wife of the 54-year-old) had minor injuries. Two occupants of the minivan Alkonis was driving also received extensive care at a hospital for neck and back pain.

Alkonis pleaded guilty to negligent driving in hopes of receiving a suspended sentence. He wrote letters of apology and paid the bereaved families more than 160 million yen in extrajudicial restitution to the victims' families. At trial, Alkonis said he had been suffering from "acute mountain sickness" and that about five minutes before the crash "I felt my body get weak, and my car drifted out of the lane, but I was able to quickly correct it." He added that he "should have immediately stopped my car" but continued to drive. Alkonis stated that his wife Brittany had also been feeling nauseated from the changes in elevation, leading her to lean her seat back and doze off shortly before the accident. Five minutes later, Alkonis said, he began to talk with one of his children when he "lost his memory" and the crash ensued.

In October 2021, the Shizuoka District Court sentenced Alkonis to three years in prison for negligent driving resulting in death and injury, declaring that he should have pulled over once he felt drowsy. Alkonis appealed the judgement to have his sentence reduced.

In July 2022, a Tokyo High Court appellate panel of three judges upheld the Shizuoka District Court's judgement of a three-year prison term. The panel stated that Alkonis was negligent in falling asleep and failing to stop the car when he felt drowsy. Alkonis did not appeal the High Court’s decision and was imprisoned beginning in September 2022.

=== US Navy accident report ===
The US Navy conducted its own investigation of the accident and states in an accident report obtained by The New York Times and Military.com that Ridge "fell asleep" at the wheel and that his Toyota left the road and slammed into five cars outside a restaurant. It was completed by US military police officers who responded to the accident.

The accident report states that Alkonis' wife, Brittany, told the responding military officers that her husband "had fallen asleep at the wheel of the vehicle" and that they both "woke up when they felt the impact." The military first responders also concluded that "after reviewing the evidence on scene and statements gathered ... [Alkonis] fell asleep while driving."

Military.com states that the accident report was the basis of the charges brought against Alkonis by Japanese prosecutors.

=== Acute mountain sickness defense ===
Although Alkonis pled guilty, he requested a lenient sentence based on the argument that he was suffering from acute mountain sickness—a condition brought on by the reduced levels of oxygen found at higher altitudes that causes dizziness, fatigue and headaches. This diagnosis first became public during his trial testimony. The main evidence came from a screening Alkonis underwent as part of a Navy evaluation done a full month after the accident. According to Alkonis, two doctors—a general practitioner and a neurologist—diagnosed Alkonis with acute mountain sickness after the accident.

According to a report produced by a US Navy officer who served as a US government observer at the trial, the Shizuoka District Court judge rejected the acute mountain sickness defense, given the location on Mount Fuji where Alkonis and his family began their drive home and because "the symptoms of mountain sickness are alleviated gradually as the altitude is lowered." The site of the accident is about 1,000 feet above sea level, as compared to the more than 2,500-foot elevation of the Mount Fuji station from which Alkonis and his family set off. The same report states that Alkonis testified that after the crash he tried to help move the car that had trapped one of the victims. He also told the court that he saw a Japanese rescue worker talking with his wife and that he "tried to help translate for their conversation."

Peter Bärtsch, a specialist in high-altitude illnesses at Heidelberg University in Germany, told The New York Times that a sudden loss of consciousness because of mountain sickness would not have been possible under the circumstances.

=== Withdrawal of U.S. Navy pay and benefits ===
In December 2022, Navy Times reported on the withdrawal of Alkonis' pay and benefits by the US Navy:

Family members of the 34-year-old sailor have lobbied the White House to seek early release for Alkonis. But Defense Department officials have said they respect the Japanese legal process, and last month said they would cut off pay and benefits for the service member and his family at the end of December. Alkonis had relied on unused leave and other time off to avoid being cut off from his military salary sooner. When it ran out, military officials classified him as absent in violation of orders, and made the pay decision.

Senate lawmakers added language in sec. 8145 of the FY23 federal budget omnibus bill to order the Navy to sustain Alkonis' "pay and allowances".

=== Transfer to United States custody and unconditional release ===
After 507 days in Japanese custody, in December 2023, Alkonis was transferred to a federal prison in Los Angeles after personal negotiations by President Joe Biden, Vice President Kamala Harris and national security adviser Jake Sullivan with the Japanese government. Under the Convention on the Transfer of Sentenced Persons and the International Prisoner Transfer Program, Alkonis was transferred to United States custody, and it was reported at his transfer that administration officials said "he was likely to continue serving his sentence in the United States."

It was reported that a Department of Justice official said that "the parole commission process could take several months," and that they would "look at Alkonis’ prison sentence in Japan and determine what would have been done in the US, and then determine what his remaining punishment would be." However, the United States Parole Commission released him in under thirty days with no supervision, having served less than half of his sentence.

== Response ==
Alkonis' imprisonment caused tensions in US-Japan relations, amid growing US pressure to release Alkonis from Japanese custody. In August 2022, some 20 U.S. Senators sent a letter to Japan's Prime Minister requesting the release of Alkonis, stating that they were "extremely troubled" by Japan's ruling. The ruling was also criticized by the Wall Street Journal's Editorial Board, and over 30 Members of Congress, who expressed "deep concern" in a letter to President Biden that Japan had refused Alkonis basic due process.

U.S. Senator Mike Lee (R-UT) was an especially vocal detractor of Japan's handling of the case. In February 2023, Lee issued an ultimatum on Twitter to Japanese Prime Minister Fumio Kishida demanding the extrajudicial release of Alkonis within 24 hours and threatened to cut off military aid to Japan if his demand was not met. News writer Jim Swift criticized the move as reckless in a The Bulwark op-ed, and noted that Lee would have limited power to make good on his threat. After his deadline passed without action, he questioned the Status of Forces Agreement between the U.S. and Japan on the floor of the U.S. Senate. Japan's Ministry of Foreign Affairs lodged an official complaint against Lee through the U.S. government calling his remarks "false and inappropriate" in March 2023.

Following Alkonis's release, Senator Lee demanded an official apology from Japan for their actions in imprisoning Alkonis.

== See also ==
- Death of Harry Dunn
- Death of Teo Peter
- Extraterritoriality
