= Shelby Gap Railroad Station, Kentucky =

Unincorporated community in Kentucky, United States

Shelby Gap Railroad Station
- Unincorporated community
- Location within the state of Kentucky Shelby Gap Railroad Station (the United States)
- Coordinates: 37°12′44″N 82°33′21″W
- Country: United States
- State: Kentucky
- County: Pike
- Elevation: 1,352 ft (412 m)
- Time zone: UTC-5 (Eastern (EST))
  - Summer (DST): UTC-4 (EDT)
- ZIP codes: 41563
- GNIS feature ID: 2337032

Shelby Gap is an unincorporated community located in Pike County, Kentucky, United States. Its post office closed in 2004. The Shelby Gap railroad corridor featured a stop along the SV&E line. Containing 7.8 miles of track between Shelby Gap and Myra.
