= Joe Szakos =

American community organizer

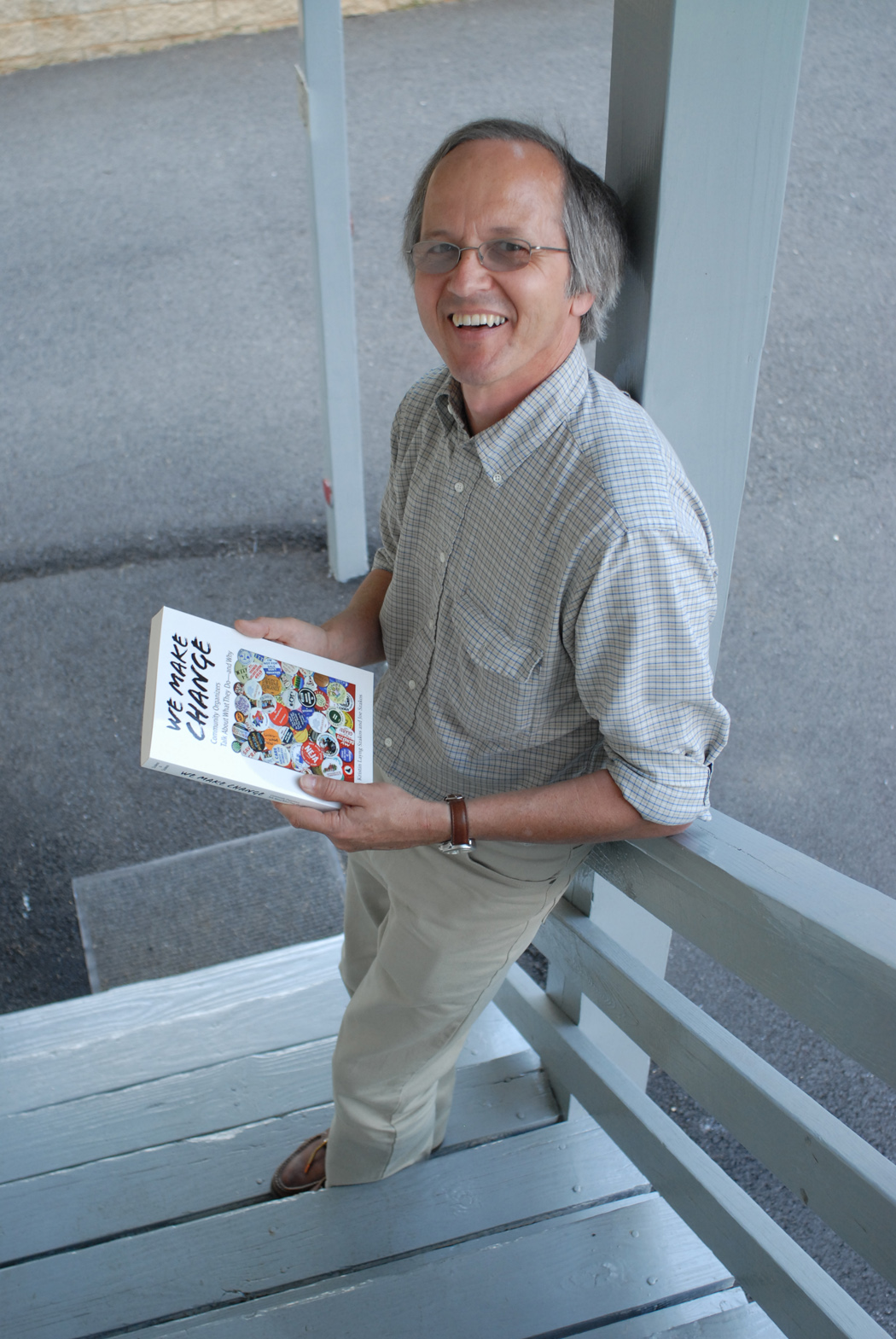
- Joe Szakos, June 2007; photo by Laura Ramirez
- Born: March 8, 1954 (age 72); Greensburg, Pennsylvania
- Education: Washington & Jefferson College; University of Chicago
- Occupation: community organizer

Joe Szakos (born March 8, 1954) is an American community organizer and author. He was coordinator of Kentuckians for the Commonwealth (KFTC) from 1981 to 1993, and was the executive director of Virginia Organizing from 1994 to 2017. After stepping down from the directorship, he became the Lynchburg Chapter organizer until his retirement in November 2020.

== Early life ==
Joseph Szakos was born March 8, 1954, in Greensburg, Pennsylvania. His paternal grandparents were Hungarian immigrants, and his maternal grandparents were Italian immigrants. He earned a bachelor's degree from Washington and Jefferson College, graduating in 1976 with honors in political science and sociology. He earned a master's degree from the School of Social Service Administration at the University of Chicago in 1979.

== Career as community organizer ==
In 1976 in his senior year of college he worked on the weekends at a residential program for people who had been in mental institutions and were reintegrating back into the community. When he asked a board member of the program why the residents did not have better support services the board member told him it was because people diagnosed with mental illnesses "are not organized." This motivated him to learn more about organizing. After getting his master's degree, Szakos began his work in eastern Kentucky working on housing development in David (Floyd County) in 1979. He worked as a reporter for the Martin Countian in Inez, Kentucky in 1980–81, and field coordinator for the Appalachian Alliance in 1982. In December 1982 he became coordinator of the Kentucky Fair Tax Coalition (KFTC), which became Kentuckians For The Commonwealth in 1988. After ten years with KTFC, Szakos spent a year in 1993–94 as director of a community organizing project in Nagykovácsi, Hungary. He returned to the U.S. in 1994 to become the founding executive director of the Virginia Organizing Project.

During Barack Obama's presidency, Szakos was one of a number of community organizers interviewed by mainstream media outlets and researchers about community organizing, their efforts to get out the vote and to advocate for health care reform and other issues, and/or how these efforts influenced and were influenced by Obama's presidency.

In 2009, Szakos was arrested by his own health insurance company, Anthem Blue Cross, after he and three Virginia Organizing Project board members tried to ask why their organization's premiums had risen 14%. He was later interviewed about it on MSNBC. In August 2010 the group shortened its name to Virginia Organizing.

While at Virginia Organizing Szakos also advocated for improvements to public education funding and standards, changes to the criminal justice system to allow low-level offenders to care for their family members and seek employment, and against racism and anti-immigrant practices. He also collaborated with and supported other community groups.

In a 2005 paper, Szakos emphasized the need for a collective recruitment plan for community organizers. He has completed two books on community organizing with his wife, Kristin Layng Szakos. One book (We Make Change, 2007) is based on 81 interviews with community organizers across the country about what they do and why they do it. The other (Lessons from the Field, 2008) is a compilation of essays written by experienced rural community organizers, sharing lessons they have learned.

== Bibliography ==
- Kristin Layng Szakos and Joe Szakos, We Make Change: Community Organizers Talk about What They Do - and Why (Vanderbilt University Press, 2007). ISBN 978-0-8265-1555-1
- Joe Szakos and Kristin Layng Szakos, Lessons from the Field: Organizing in Rural Communities (American Institute for Social Justice, 2008). ISBN 978-0-9799215-0-6
