= The David School =

The David School of David, Kentucky
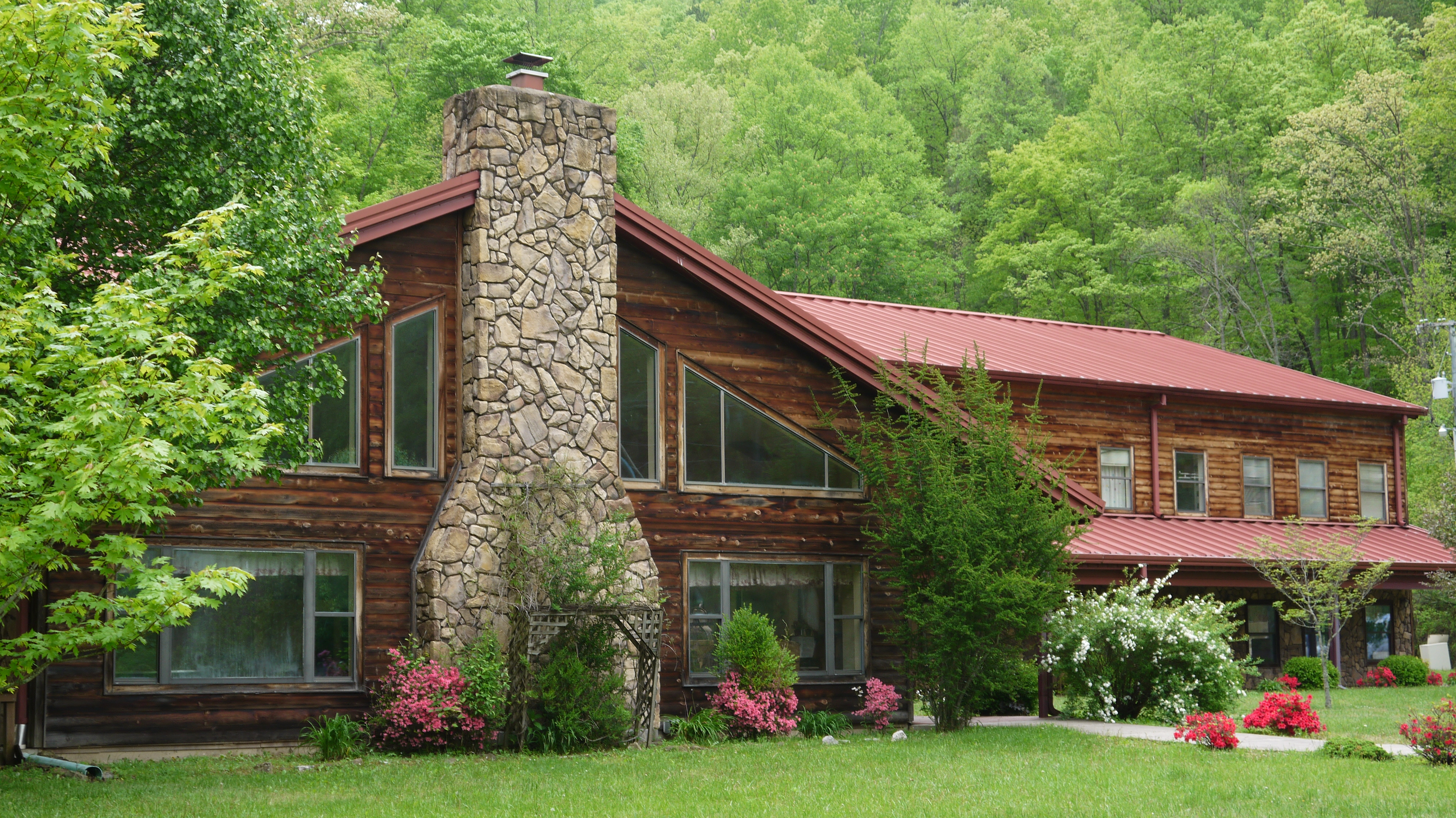

Location
- David, Kentucky; United States; 37.604°N 82.899°W

Information
- Type: Private school
- Motto: Learning While Serving
- Denomination: Non-denominational
- Established: 1974
- Principal: Bryan Lafferty
- Grades: 9th-12th
- Colors: Maroon and gray
- Mascot: Falcon
- Website: mydavidschool.org

The David School is a non-denominational private high school for underprivileged and struggling students in David, Kentucky, a rural village in the Appalachian Mountains of the United States.

== History ==
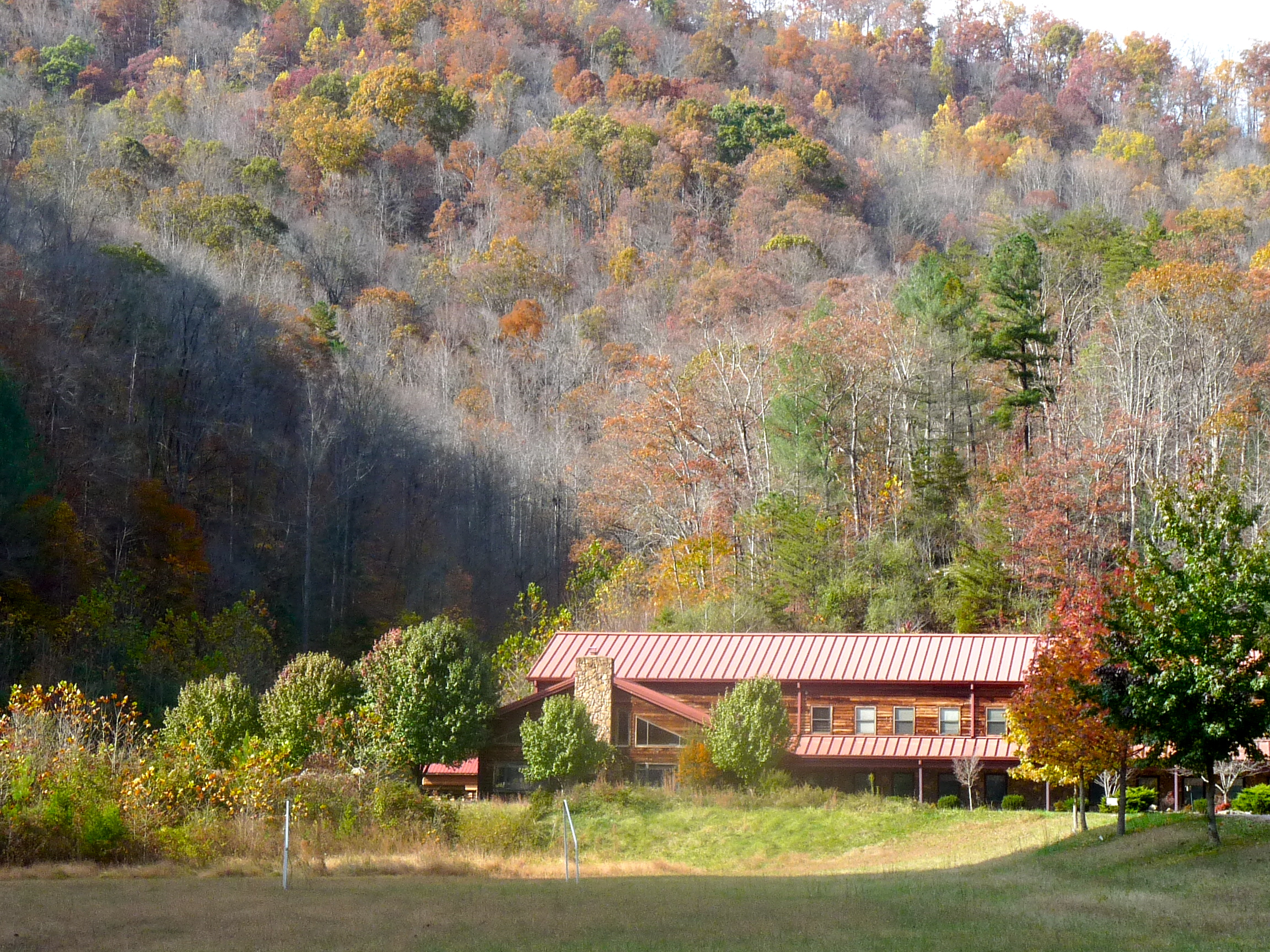
The David School campus

The school was started in the 1970s by Danny Greene, originally from New York City, who moved to David as a college sophomore and was moved by the rampant poverty and illiteracy there.

The Attorney General of Kentucky conducted an investigation, beginning in 2011, into Greene's alleged mismanagement. Upon presentation of the evidence, in May 2012, Floyd County Circuit Judge Johnny Ray Harris, assigned a new school board. The ruling also banned Greene and Sister Emma Kriz, the former principal, from any further school involvement.

== Country Boys ==
The David School was featured in the six-hour documentary series Country Boys, broadcast on the PBS series Frontline in 2006. Filmmaker David Sutherland spent three years at the David School chronicling the lives of two at-risk adolescents, Cody Perkins and Chris Johnson, as they grapple with and overcome daunting emotional and physical obstacles related to their unique family lives and the economic situation of this region.
