= Christopher R. Cooper =

American judge (born 1966)

Christopher Cooper
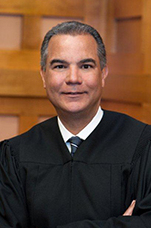

Judge of the United States District Court for the District of Columbia
- Incumbent
- Assumed office March 28, 2014
- Appointed by: Barack Obama
- Preceded by: Royce Lamberth

Personal details
- Born: Christopher Reid Cooper; 1966 (age 59–60) Mobile, Alabama, U.S.
- Spouse: Amy Jeffress
- Education: Yale University (BA); Stanford University (JD)

Christopher Reid "Casey" Cooper (born 1966) is an American lawyer and jurist who serves as a United States district judge of the United States District Court for the District of Columbia. He was appointed in 2014 by President Barack Obama.

== Early life and education ==
Cooper was born in Mobile, Alabama, in 1966. He received a Bachelor of Arts degree, summa cum laude, in 1988 from Yale University, where he was also a member of Phi Beta Kappa. He received a Juris Doctor with distinction in 1993 from Stanford Law School, where he was president of the Stanford Law Review.

== Career ==
Cooper served as a law clerk for Judge Abner Mikva of the United States Court of Appeals for the District of Columbia Circuit from 1993 to 1994. From 1994 to 1996, he served as a Special Assistant to the Deputy Attorney General in the United States Department of Justice. He was employed as an associate at Miller, Cassidy, Larroca & Lewin LLC from 1996 until its merger with Baker Botts LLP in 2001, working as a partner at the latter firm until 2012, when he joined Covington & Burling LLP as a partner. Cooper remained at Covington & Burling until his appointment to the federal bench. While in private practice, Cooper "represented diverse sets of clients in both criminal and civil investigations, with a focus on white-collar and anti-corruption matters." Cooper served on the Obama/Biden transition team in 2008 as an advisor on Justice Department issues.

=== Federal judicial service ===
On August 1, 2013, President Barack Obama nominated Cooper to serve as a United States district judge of the United States District Court for the District of Columbia, to the seat vacated by Judge Royce C. Lamberth, who assumed senior status on July 15, 2013. On January 16, 2014, his nomination was reported out of the Senate Judiciary Committee by a voice vote. On March 26, 2014, the United States Senate invoked cloture on his nomination by a 56–43 vote. His nomination was confirmed later that day by a 100–0 vote. He received his commission two days later.

==== Noteworthy cases ====
Among Cooper's notable cases in the U.S. district court is the criminal case of Ahmed Abu Khattala, who is charged with orchestrating the 2012 Benghazi attack. In a pretrial evidentiary ruling, Cooper denied Khattala's motion to suppress statements he made to FBI agents while detained on the Navy ship USS New York en route to the United States, a significant victory for federal prosecutors. Trial began in October 2017.

In 2014, Cooper rejected a challenge brought by various pet-breeding groups against the United States Department of Agriculture. The challengers sought to invalidate Animal and Plant Health Inspection Service regulations affecting certain pet breeders who make Internet sales. Cooper upheld the rules in a "pun-filled" decision.

In 2015, Cooper issued a 21-page decision dismissing a suit brought by the Florida counties of Indian River and Martin seeking to block the All Aboard Florida railway project (later known as Brightline) on environmental grounds. Cooper ruled that the counties lacked standing to pursue their claim, and wrote: "The Court is mindful of the vigorous debate in Central and South Florida over whether the express railway should be built. But the relative merits of the project are not for this Court to decide."

Cooper presided over a Freedom of Information Act lawsuit, Shapiro v. CIA, filed in 2014 by an MIT graduate student against the CIA and NSA. The student sought to learn if the United States government was involved in Nelson Mandela's arrest and imprisonment in 1962, and filed suit against the agencies after each denied his FOIA request. (The CIA asserted that the search would be "unreasonably burdensome" and the NSA gave a Glomar response, refusing to confirm or deny whether the agency had records involving Mandela). In 2016, Cooper denied the CIA's motion to dismiss, rejecting the agency's argument that the student had not given sufficient detail about the records he was seeking. In the same opinion, Cooper ruled that the NSA could give a Glomar response with respect to intelligence records, but not on non-intelligence records.

In 2015, Cooper heard a petition for a preliminary injunction filed by the Committee of 100 on the Federal City, which sought to block CSX Transportation's reconstruction of the Virginia Avenue Tunnel in Southeast Washington, D.C. Cooper denied the petition.

In 2016, Cooper issued a decision in a racial discrimination case brought against Airbnb. Cooper granted the company's motion to compel arbitration based on a mandatory arbitration clause in the website's terms of use.

In 2021, Cooper dismissed a defamation suit filed by Giorgi Rtskhiladze, a U.S. citizen born in the Republic of Georgia. Rtskhiladze is a friend of Donald Trump's former lawyer Michael Cohen. Rtskhiladze was unhappy with the way he was portrayed in Footnote 112 in the Mueller report, so in 2020 he sued Robert Mueller, and Cooper dismissed the case.

In 2024, Cooper held veteran reporter Catherine Herridge in civil contempt for refusing to reveal her source, saying that Chen's need for the information overcame Herridge's First Amendment protections. This has been widely criticized by journalists and First Amendment advocates.

In February 2025, Cooper denied a temporary restraining order in a lawsuit filed by a federal employees' union challenging mass firings of federal employees by the Trump administration, allowing the firings to proceed.

In May 2026, Cooper ruled that the attempted renaming and extended closure of the Kennedy Center was unlawful and ordered the center to resume using the original name and stay open.

== Personal life ==
Cooper is African-American. Cooper is married to Amy Jeffress, a former Justice Department official and national security counselor to former United States Attorney General Eric Holder.

== See also ==
- List of African-American federal judges
- List of African-American jurists

Legal offices
Preceded by Royce Lamberth	Judge of the United States District Court for the District of Columbia; 2014–present	Incumbent
