= Middle Creek Subdivision =

Railway line in Kentucky

The Middle Creek Subdivision is a railroad line owned and operated by CSX Transportation in the U.S. state of Kentucky. It was formerly part of the Huntington West Division. It became part of the CSX Florence Division on June 20, 2016. It splits from the Big Sandy Subdivision at Prestonsburg and runs southwest to a dead end at David for a total of 10.1 miles (16.3 km). CSX filed to abandon all but the first mile (2 km) at Prestonsburg in 2004; it had not seen traffic since the early 1990s. However, due to complications regarding possible rail banking and its effect on the Middle Creek National Battlefield, the line has not yet been abandoned as of 2006. The line is now abandoned, and has been purchased by the city of Prestonsburg, Kentucky. The tracks are now gone and it is currently being converted into a trail.
