= Country Boys =

2006 American documentary film

- Written by: David Sutherland
- Directed by: David Sutherland
- Starring: Chris Johnson; Cody Perkins; Jessica Riddle; David Stükenberg
- Theme music composer: Seth Justman
- Country of origin: United States
- Original language: English

Production
- Producers: David Sutherland; Erin Anguish; Sarah Moughty; Michael Sullivan; Sharon Tiller
- Cinematography: Bill Arnold; David Miers; Joe Seamans
- Editors: Steve Audette; Yu Ying Chou; Sean F. O'Gara

Original release
- Network: PBS
- Release: January 9, 2006

Country Boys is a six-hour documentary film centered on Cody Perkins and Chris Johnson, two teenage boys from David, Kentucky. They attended the David School, a non-denominational alternative high school with a mission to serve underprivileged and struggling students.

The film covers the three-year period from 1999 to 2002 in which the boys' ages range from 15 to 18. It was directed by David Sutherland. It was a three-part edition of Frontline on PBS, with each part running for two hours, originally broadcast in January 2006.

The focus of the film is Cody and Chris' struggles with the problems of growing up in a rural, relatively impoverished environment. In addition, both boys have unique challenges. Chris, growing up in a family without strong role models and parents who limit him in a variety of ways, struggles to motivate himself to do well in school and life. Cody deals with how to find acceptance among his peers and reconcile his Christianity with his alternative lifestyle.

The film is set in rural Kentucky. As a result, the film addresses a wide range of topics. Some of these topics include the gun culture, religion and science (a biology teacher and students at the David School are portrayed dismissing evolution and misinterpreting scientific ideas).

== Garry Lee Cody Perkins ==
Cody was born on 19 October 1983, in Lexington, Kentucky. When he was 5 months old, his mother killed herself. When he was 12 years old, his father killed Cody's stepmother (his 7th wife) and then himself. Cody then left his life in the city to live in the country with his step-grandmother, Liz McGuire.

At the time of the filming, Cody had a girlfriend, Jessica Riddle. Both were born again Christians. At one point Cody wanted to be a preacher. In the documentary he played in a Christian heavy metal band, Seven Rise Up. The film shows Cody getting nipple piercings to add to his many other piercings, later having discussions with his teachers and storefront church pastor, and bonding with Jessica and her parents in the living room of their home. Cody graduated valedictorian of his small class of seven at the David School.

=== Post-documentary ===
Cody and Jessica married on April 10, 2004, and both attended college. Cody graduated from Mayo Technical College in May 2006 and began working as a service technician with an HVAC company. Cody and Jessica divorced in 2006, and Cody has since remarried and has four kids. The band, Seven Rise Up, is no longer together. The bulk of the band formed Bellor; Cody left the group but formed another band, Sledgehammer Persuasion, but they have disbanded. Cody is now playing bass in the worship band at a church in Prestonsburg and has formed a new Christian metal band with former Seven Rise Up bandmate Jason Johnson. Cody is saved and got baptized with his new wife, they attend a small church in Prestonsburg, KY, where he is beginning to preach and the two of them teach an adult bible study together.

== Chris Johnson ==
At the beginning of the documentary, Chris lived in a trailer home with his father, Randall (who could not work because of medical problems related to his drinking), his mother, Sheila, his grandmother (who is rarely shown in the documentary until the very end), his younger brother, Daniel, and his younger sister, Amy. Chris received Supplemental Security Income for disability, related to a behavior disorder that played a role in his going to The David School. The Supplemental Security Income is a prominent element in the documentary as it is a reliable source of income for Chris and his mother. They both worry that he might lose the benefit if he does well in school, is re-evaluated and it is found that he no longer has a behavior disorder. He does not lose it during the documentary, but the supplement ends when he turns 18.

Later in the documentary, his mother moves out (his parents fought regularly) and eventually moves in with a boyfriend and then moves to Florida. Chris worked at various low wage jobs during the documentary, including jobs at Taco Bell and Little Caesars, making him fall behind in school. With no transportation to school, and disgusted at his father's condition, Chris is given a free apartment of his own temporarily in town. Near the end of the documentary he passes the exam to receive his GED and graduates from The David School. He visits and attempts to get into nearby Alice Lloyd College, but does poorly on the ACT. The film's end shows Chris starting the long drive to his estranged mother's house in Florida, in a truck carrying his family's belongings after they are evicted from their trailer, and uncertain whether his mother will welcome them.

=== Post-documentary ===
Chris's father, Randall Johnson, died due to health related issues stemming from alcoholism in 2005. Chris has had various jobs, including fast food, lawn care, and working in coal mines. He spent some time outside of Kentucky but moved back as he missed his home state. The most recent updates say he still lives in rural Kentucky with his friend Jay Pritchard. Unlike Cody, there is no evidence that Chris has an online presence.
