= Amy Jeffress =

American lawyer and former U.S. public official

- Born: Dorothy Ames Jeffress; 1964 or 1965 (age 61–62)
- Education: Williams College; Free University of Berlin; Yale Law School
- Occupation: Lawyer
- Spouse: Christopher R. Cooper

Dorothy Ames Jeffress, known as Amy Jeffress, is an attorney and former public official in the United States. She is a partner at the law firm Hecker Fink LLP.

== Early life and education ==
Jeffress is the daughter of William H. Jeffress Jr., a prominent Washington defense attorney, and Judith Jeffress, a social worker. Jeffress graduated from Williams College and obtained a master's degree in political science from the Free University of Berlin. She completed her Juris Doctor degree at Yale Law School. She worked as a law clerk for Judge Gerhard Gesell, and then, following his death in 1993, completed her clerkship with Judge Thomas F. Hogan.

== Career ==
During the Clinton administration, Jeffress worked for the U.S. Department of Justice (DOJ) as a prosecutor. She worked as a national security counselor to Attorney General Eric Holder and then as the Justice department attache at the U.S. embassy in London for three years. During her tenure as a national security prosecutor at the DOJ, she consulted with U.S. District Judge Royce Lamberth, who then agreed in 2008 to unseal documents from the FBI investigation into the 2001 anthrax attacks. As an advisor to Holder, she created interagency task forces to review the cases of detainees at the Guantanamo Bay detention camp.

In 2014, Jeffress joined the law firm Arnold & Porter as a partner, with a focus on criminal defense, national security law, and white collar business practices. In November 2015, she was also appointed as a public advocate at the Foreign Intelligence Surveillance Court (FISC). As a public advocate, she contributed as an amicus curae after being asked to examine intelligence gathering and retention practices by national security agencies and the FBI, and she wrote the FBI practices "go far beyond the purpose for which the Section 702-acquired information is collected in permitting queries that are unrelated to national security" and "These practices do not comply with ... the Fourth Amendment."

In 2016, Jeffress participated in the mock trial of Winston vs. Oceania, based on the George Orwell novel Nineteen Eighty-Four, which aired on C-SPAN. In 2018, Jeffress represented Lisa Page. In 2020 and 2021, Jeffress represented Anne Sacoolas, the wife of a U.S. diplomat involved in a fatal car crash in the United Kingdom.

In 2025, former president Joe Biden appointed Jeffress as his personal attorney, replacing Bob Bauer.

== Honors and awards ==
- 2006 Attorney General's John Marshall Award

== Personal life ==
Her brother Jonathan Jeffress has worked for the Office of the Federal Public Defender.

Jeffress is married to Christopher R. Cooper, Judge of the United States District Court for the District of Columbia. Merrick Garland officiated at their wedding.
