= Virginia Organizing =

American non-partisan grassroots organization

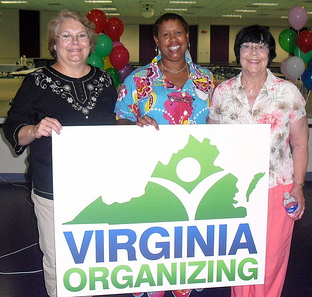
- Founded: 1995 as Virginia Organizing Project
- Key people: Del McWhorter, Chairperson; Brian Johns, Executive Director
- Website: virginia-organizing.org

Virginia Organizing, formerly known as the Virginia Organizing Project (VOP), is a non-partisan grassroots organization in the state of Virginia. Founded in 1995, Virginia Organizing brings people together to address issues that affect the quality of life in their local communities. Notably, Virginia Organizing engages in community organizing that is both multi-issue and multi-constituency, with a focus on people who have traditionally had little voice in society.

== Issues ==
Virginia Organizing coordinates civic engagement and direct action on many different issues at all levels from the local county Board of Supervisors to the White House. Organizers and leaders recruit new members and identify issue priorities through door-to-door canvassing, phone banks, 1-to-1 conversations, and community meetings.

Virginia Organizing focuses on a diverse set of issues each year, based on a power analysis that is completed every spring. In recent years, Virginia Organizing has primarily focused on health care reform, economic justice, and racial justice issues like discriminatory policing and the school-to-prison pipeline. Virginia Organizing added women's issues and climate change to their list of priorities in 2015. Other notable issue campaigns include opposing predatory lending, fighting for restoration of voting rights for former-felons, immigration reform, and protecting Medicare and Social Security.

== History ==
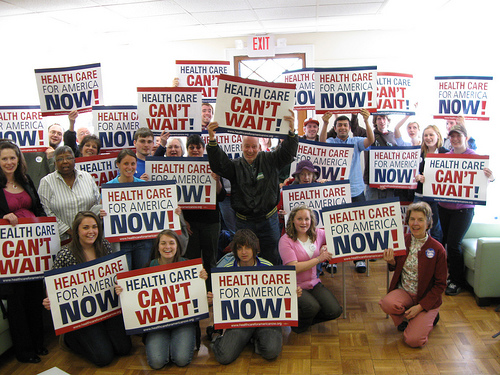
Supporting Health Care Reform

In 1995, the Virginia Organizing Project (VOP) was formed in Southwest Virginia. Joe Szakos was the first executive director and organizer. From the start, its focus was on building chapters and addressing issues of racial and economic inequality. The first Virginia Organizing chapter formed in Lee County, and the Lynchburg Chapter also hosted the first three-day Dismantling Racism Workshop, kick-starting workshops all across the state. Virginia Organizing's founding statewide convention took place on June 21, 1997, with more than 135 people in attendance.

As the 1990s came to a close, the Lee County Chapter created Virginia Organizing's first successful campaign, challenging the county jury selection process and successfully implementing a random selection process; for the first time, an African American served as jury commissioner. At the state level, Virginia Organizing publicly supported adding sexual orientation and gender to existing Virginia hate crime laws in the 1998 General Assembly, and the Federal Reserve Bank of Richmond set up a Community Development Advisory Council to deal with issues concerning low-income and working-class people.

Virginia Organizing's first statewide campaign focused on the need for more affordable housing in the state of Virginia. In 2002, following years of organizing, Virginia Organizing succeeded in getting the Virginia Housing Development Authority to approve more than $339 million to finance low-income homeownership and rental construction loans and to open its public comment process. In 2004, the Petersburg Chapter succeeded in a campaign to get the city to fund a fair housing officer/housing ombudsman position.

As Virginia Organizing became more involved in civic engagement, it and other groups pushed Governor Mark Warner to make major changes to the process of restoration of voting rights in 2002, reducing the application from thirteen pages to one for former non-violent felons. In 2008, Virginia Organizing brought together over a dozen statewide organizations to form the Virginia c-3 Table, a group focused on non-partisan civic engagement activities in the state. It was the first time that most of the largest people’s organizations in Virginia came together in a formal way for a common purpose. The organization hired 50 interns who knocked on more than 140,000 doors. Virginia Organizing distributed 300,000 copies of a 32-page non-partisan voter guide. The following year, Virginia Organizing's 40 paid interns canvassed 142,679 doors across the state.

At the same time, Virginia Organizing became the Health Care for America Now campaign’s lead organization in Virginia and organized health care forums, rallies and press conferences with a wide range of groups across the state. For this and its other work, Virginia Organizing received the 2009 Community Change Champion Award from the Center for Community Change for making a deep and meaningful commitment to low-income communities.

Since 2010, Virginia Organizing has won a more inclusive mural in the Spotsylvania County Board of Supervisors meeting room, Ban the Box campaigns in multiple cities and statewide, a repeal of anti-returning citizen language in an Amherst County ordinance, and significant improvements in the restoration of rights process, among other victories.

== Structure and staff ==
Virginia Organizing has a joint plan of work with more than 40 organizations across the state, supporting their work in the environment, education, transportation, human rights, and community support.

Under the leadership of Executive Director Brian Johns, Virginia Organizing has a staff of 14 community organizers across the state of Virginia (and growing). These organizers work to build local chapters and organize local community members around making positive social change.
