= Emily Hunt =

British author, campaigner and former adviser

Emily Hunt-Adiletta
- Born: Emily Bronwen Hunt
- Other name: Emily Hunt
- Citizenship: United Kingdom, United States
- Occupations: Author, campaigner, adviser
- Awards: Officer of the Order of the British Empire
- Website: www.emilyinpublic.com

Emily Hunt-Adiletta (born Emily Bronwen Hunt; published as Emily Hunt) is a British and American author, campaigner and former government adviser. She is known for intervening in R v Richards (2020), a Court of Appeal decision that clarified the law of voyeurism in England and Wales, and for a related legal campaign against the Crown Prosecution Service. She later advised the UK government on the criminal justice response to rape, and was appointed an Officer of the Order of the British Empire (OBE) in 2023.

== Early career ==
Hunt worked in market research, insights and communications. She was director of insights at Edelman Berland, the insights and analytics subsidiary of the communications firm Edelman, and was later managing director of the data consultancy 36ns, speaking publicly on "data storytelling" including at Data Festival London. In November 2020 she was appointed a non-executive director of the social-media research consultancy Bakamo.Social.

== Legal case and significance ==
In May 2015, Hunt reported waking in a London hotel room next to a man she did not know and said she had been assaulted; she later learned that he had covertly filmed her while she was naked and unconscious.

The Crown Prosecution Service (CPS) declined to prosecute, including for voyeurism, and Hunt brought a judicial review of that decision, crowdfunding to support the legal action.

The underlying point of law was resolved in R v Richards [2020] EWCA Crim 95, a Court of Appeal appeal in which Hunt was permitted to intervene on behalf of the CPS — which argued the opposite of the position it had taken in Hunt's own case. The court held that a person who consents to sexual activity in private retains a reasonable expectation that they will not be filmed, so that covertly filming them without consent amounts to voyeurism under the Sexual Offences Act 2003 — including where the person filming is a participant. The CPS subsequently conceded Hunt's judicial review in January 2020 and accepted that its original decision had been unlawful. The man who had filmed her later pleaded guilty to voyeurism and was sentenced in 2020.

The decision has been examined in legal scholarship and is reported in the Weekly Law Reports as R v Richards (Tony) (Hunt intervening) [2020] 1 WLR 3344.

== Government adviser ==
Hunt served as an independent adviser to the UK government on improving the criminal justice system for victims of rape. She resigned from the role in 2023, citing what she described as a lack of will to deliver change.

== Writing ==
She is the author of We Need to Talk: The Truth About Sexual Violence and My Fight for Justice (Mardle Books, 2023).

== Honours ==
Hunt was appointed an Officer of the Order of the British Empire (OBE) in the 2023 New Year Honours for services to victims of sexual violence.
