= OneVirginia2021 =

American civic non-profit organization

- Formation: 2013
- Type: Non-Profit Political Advocacy
- Location: Richmond, Virginia
- Website: http://onevirginia2021.org/

OneVirginia2021 is an American civic non-profit organization founded to advocate for a non-partisan redistricting of the Commonwealth of Virginia. The group was founded in Charlottesville, Virginia in 2013 and is currently based in Richmond, Virginia.

== 2019 Constitutional amendment ==
In 2018, OneVirginia2021 convened a bipartisan committee of former legislators. This committee drafted a model constitutional amendment, which was proposed to the Virginia State Assembly in the 2019 session. The proposal emphasized a separate redistricting commission, transparency and citizen participation. Many of these recommendations were included in the legislation passed in the 2019 Assembly Session.

In 2019, the Virginia General Assembly passed the “first read” of a constitutional amendment, Virginia Redistricting Reform Amendment (HJ615/SJ306), that would end partisan gerrymandering in the commonwealth. This bill was passed by a vote of 83-15 in the House of Delegates and 39-1 in the Virginia Senate. The main components of this include citizen involvement, transparency, and mitigation of partisan gerrymandering. It would create a sixteen-member advisory commission and establish redistricting criteria for congressional and state legislative districts. It was passed by voters in November 2020.

== Other efforts ==
On September 14, 2015, OneVirginia2021 filed a suit in Vesilind v. Virginia State Board of Elections claiming 11 Virginia state districts fail the criteria of compactness outlined by the Virginia State Constitution. In an official release, OneVirginia2021 executive director Brian Cannon says, “Far from having a standard, the legislature effectively ignored the Constitution on this point, and gave us distorted, weirdly shaped districts that break up communities and rig elections by depriving voters of meaningful competition”. The Virginia supreme court upheld the districts.

In 2015, OneVirginia2021 backed SJ 284, an independent redistricting commission with non-partisan criteria co-patroned by Virginia Senators Jill Vogel (R) and Louise Lucas (D).

OneVirginia2021, in conjunction with Richmond public broadcasting station WCVE, produced a documentary film about gerrymandering. The documentary examines the historical context and consequences of gerrymandering through a multi-partisan lens. The documentary is titled GerryRIGGED: Turning Democracy On Its Head and was premiered on WCVE on October 24, 2016.

OneVirginia2021 has Local Action Groups (LAGs) across the state, which promote redistricting reform in their local regions.

== See also ==
- Virginia's congressional districts
- Bethune-Hill v. Virginia State Bd. of Elections
- Virginia General Assembly
- Redistricting in Virginia
