= David, Kentucky =

Unincorporated community in Kentucky, United States

- Unincorporated community
- Location within the Commonwealth of Kentucky David (the United States)
- Coordinates: 37°35′58″N 82°53′27″W
- Country: United States
- State: Kentucky
- County: Floyd
- Elevation: 709 ft (216 m)

Population (2000)
  - Total: 435
- Time zone: UTC-5 (Eastern (EST))
  - Summer (DST): UTC-4 (EDT)
- ZIP code: 41616
- Area code: 606
- GNIS feature ID: 490621

David is an unincorporated community and coal town in Floyd County, Kentucky, United States. It bears the postal ZIP code 41616. The U.S. Census of 2000 recorded a population of 435.

== History ==
The town was named for David L. Francis, president of Princess Elkhorn Coal Company, which originally built and owned the town.

Although it was formerly a company town, it was in many ways a model coal community, with amenities not typical of the region at the time, including a swimming pool, central water and sewer, and cable TV service. The company also supported a children's choir, which toured nationally. When Princess-Elkhorn sold the community in the late 1960s, many of these amenities fell into disrepair, and the housing stock deteriorated from over 100 units to slightly more than 30. The town rallied around a hepatitis outbreak and ultimately purchased the entire village from the investor who owned it. The mechanism for this purchase was the creation of the David Community Development Corporation, which went on to secure funding for a new water and sewer system, a fire station, a new park, and several dozen new homes.

== Geography ==
Located in the Appalachian Mountains, it lies on Kentucky Route 404, approximately 100 miles (160 km) southeast of Lexington.

The Middle Creek Subdivision of CSX Transportation ends in David from nearby Prestonsburg.

== Education ==
The David School was featured in the six-hour documentary film Country Boys which was broadcast in Frontline on PBS, about two residents, Chris and Cody, and their life in the poor, rural mountain town.

== Notable person ==
- Joe Szakos, community organizer and author, who in 1979 worked on housing development in the community.
