= Teo Peter =

Romanian musician killed in a traffic collision with a US Marine

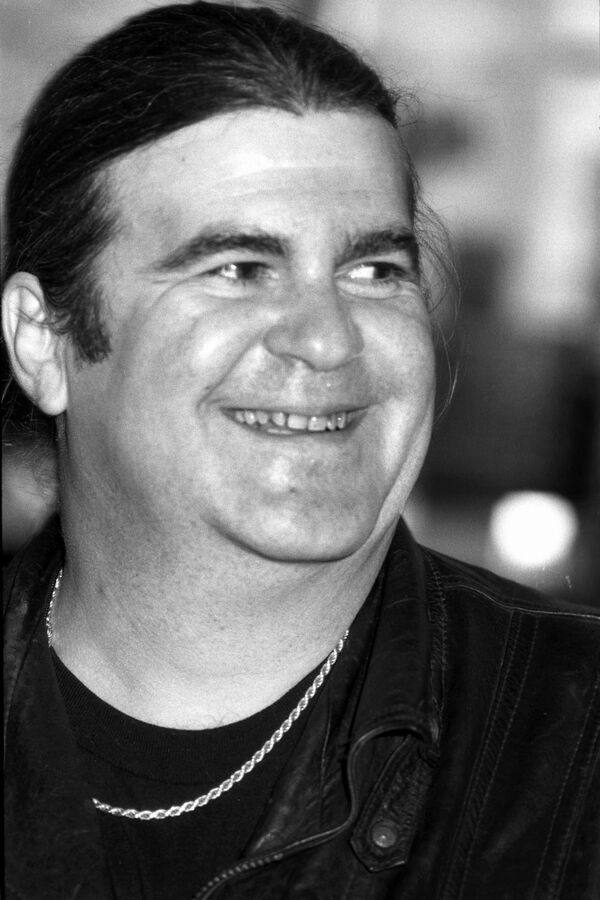
Teo Peter in 1995

Teofil Nelu Peter (11 April 1954 – 4 December 2004) was a Romanian rock musician and bass player for Compact.

Peter was born in Cluj-Napoca, in Romania, in 1954. Compact was formed in Cluj-Napoca in 1977. Teo Peter had a brother.

== Death ==
Peter was killed in a traffic collision at 04:30 on 4 December 2004 when 31-year-old U.S. Marine Staff Sergeant Christopher Van Goethem serving as a Marine Security Guard at the U.S. embassy in Bucharest, while driving his Ford Expedition, collided with a taxi carrying Peter. Van Goethem did not obey a traffic signal to stop, which resulted in the collision. Peter was buried on 7 December in Mănăștur Cemetery, in his native Cluj-Napoca.

Although Van Goethem had admitted to drinking about three and a half beers over the course of the evening, tests of his blood returned negative for both alcohol and drugs, and he fled to Germany before charges could be filed in Romania. The Romanian government requested the American government lift his diplomatic immunity, which it has refused to do. Van Goethem was later cleared by a court martial of both manslaughter and adultery while convicted for obstruction of justice and making false statements.

Peter's death and Van Goethem's court martial were very controversial and led to protests from Romanians in the United States.

In 2005, the U.S. Embassy announced the establishment of a memorial commemorating the life and work of Teo Peter. The memorial is an annual professional visit program awarded to a distinguished Romanian cultural figure whose work addresses young people or helps to advance the careers of new artists and performers.

== See also ==
- Yangju highway incident
- Death of Harry Dunn
- 1998 Cavalese cable car crash
