= The Farmer's Wife (1998 film) =

1998 documentary film by David Sutherland

The Farmer's Wife is a 1998 documentary film by David Sutherland that follows Juanita and Darrel Buschkoetter, a young couple living on and maintaining a farm in rural Nebraska, who face difficulties holding on to their finances, their livelihood, and their marriage. The film aired in three parts on the PBS series Frontline in September 1998.

== Plot ==
=== Part 1 ===
Part 1 of The Farmer's Wife recounts the moving story of Juanita and Darrel Buschkoetter's romantic love affair and begins the journey to the core of their emotional struggles, which have pushed their marriage to the brink. David Sutherland eschews the use of a narrator in this film, allowing Darrel and Juanita tell their own story in their own words, without the intrusion of a narrator, and to let the story play out on its own.

=== Part 2 ===
In Part 2, the camera focuses on the rhythms of everyday life on the Buschkoetters' farm. The film follows Juanita, Darrel, and their three daughters through days reminiscent of a forgotten, simpler time in America. Difficulties arise, however: In September, an early frost destroys 30% of their crop. The loss forces Darrel to go to work at a nearby farm (making $7/hour in return), while he farms his own land at night. Juanita, meanwhile, cleans houses while trying to get a college degree so Darrel can stay home and farm. Darrel, however, worries that if Juanita goes off the farm, she'll find a job and life she likes better. By Christmas, the family is dead broke and unsure of their future.

=== Part 3 ===
In the concluding episode, Darrel finally harvests the bumper crop he had dreamt about his whole life. It's not quite enough, however, as Darrel has to work for another farmer just to make enough money to feed his family. The resulting stress and exhaustion cause him to explode, prompting Juanita to take their daughters and leave the farm for a week. The move has a deep and profound effect on Darrel. Two months later, through counseling, Darrel learns to manage his anger and undergoes extraordinary personal growth. Darrel agrees to be the at-home parent, farming and caring for his three daughters while Juanita, college degree in hand, works at a respected crop insurance company in order to help other struggling farmers. In the end, through faith, hope, and hard work, the Buschkoetters save their farm and rediscover the love that holds them together.
