= David Sutherland (filmmaker) =

American documentary filmmaker

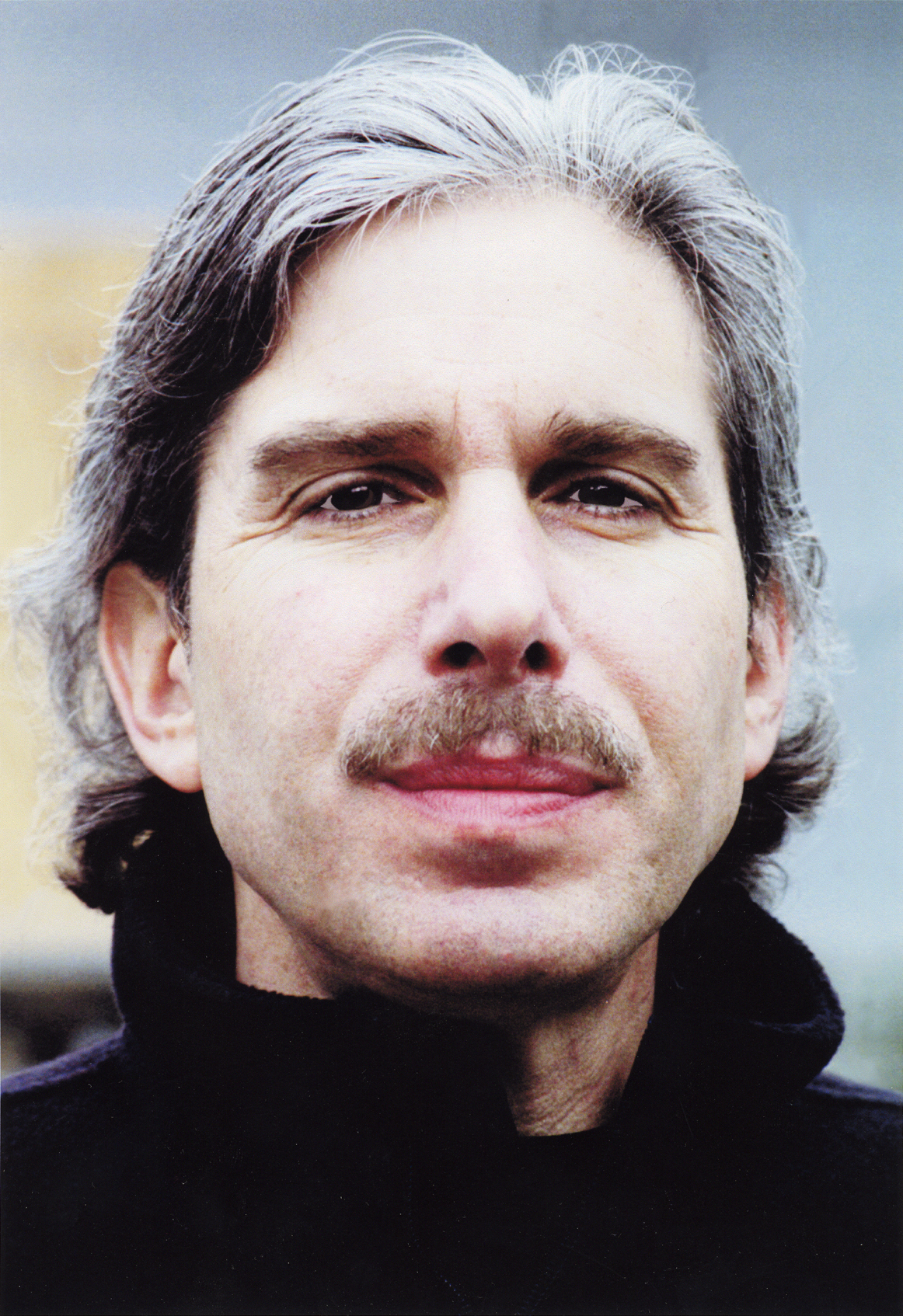
- Sutherland in 2004
- Born: July 31, 1945 (age 81)
- Occupation: Documentary Filmmaker
- Writing career
- Years active: 1984 - present
- Genre: Portraiture
- Notable works: Kind Hearted Woman, Country Boys, The Farmer's Wife
- Website: davidsutherland.com

David Russell Sutherland (born July 31, 1945) is an American documentary filmmaker who has won over 100 international awards and citations for his films.

== Early life and education ==
Sutherland earned a Bachelor of Arts in political science from Tufts University in 1967. He went on to study film at the University of Southern California (USC).

== Career ==
Sutherland began producing documentaries a decade after leaving USC. One of his earliest films, Down Around Here, which he began filming while working at his father's tire store in the 1970s, profiled a gritty diner that Sutherland frequented. Matt Ashare of The Phoenix called the film "a poignant and remarkably resonant sketch of Boston's rapidly fading past." Much of his early work focuses on art and artists, including Paul Cadmus and Jack Levine. Of Paul Cadmus: Enfant Terrible at 80, New York Times critic John O'Connor said, "Television has never been completely at ease in dealing with art and artists... Then, every once in a great while, a film comes along to demonstrate other possibilities, other approaches. One such production is Paul Cadmus: Enfant Terrible at 80...Mr. Cadmus has been served well by Mr. Sutherland... The intense close-up succeeds in illuminating something of the artistic process that, no matter the finished style, is always profoundly serious." A reviewer for The Boston Globe said of Sutherland's 1989 film Halftime: Five Yale Men at Midlife, "A relentlessly stunning film. With the possible exception of The Thin Blue Line, no documentary in recent memory delivers more psychological insight--or emotional wallop. The pacing is flawless, the editing superb."

According to The Baltimore Sun, Sutherland is "considered by those who know documentaries to be one of the nation's greatest practitioners of the form". His films have been cited for their "depth of intimacy and long-form commitment to the filmmaking process" with some productions taking as long as three years or more to film. Also notable is his unique audio style. For his most recent film, Kind Hearted Woman, Sutherland used up to six microphones at a time to produce over 300 hours of audio recordings, which he eventually edited down for the 5-hour film. Of the result, Brian Lowry of Variety said, "Those familiar with Sutherland's work know he seeks out personal stories and follows them at an unhurried, almost-hypnotic pace, extracting intimate portraits through years of painstaking filming. He has done that and then some with [Kind Hearted Woman]." Mark Rogers of Slant Magazine called Kind Hearted Woman "one of the most compelling documentaries on modern Native American life to date."

Sutherland's Jack Levine: Feast of Pure Reason was cited by The Boston Herald as one of the ten best films of 1986, and it won 23 awards, including a Blue Ribbon from the American Film Festival. Out of Sight, one of Sutherland's feature-length films, played at the Berlin International Film Festival in 1994. Gerald Peary of The Improper Bostonian said of the film, "Out of Sight is an uncompromised, unexpected take on a blind woman, but what a blind woman! Put away all your politically correct assumptions...Starin is a hellion out of a 1940's Hollywood film noir." The Television Critics Association nominated his 1998 production The Farmer's Wife in the Best Program of the Year, Best Miniseries & Specials, and Best News & Information Program categories. Country Boys was nominated in the Outstanding Achievement in News & Information category in 2006. Writing for MTV News, Shirleen Holt named two of Sutherland's films among the five best documentaries available on DVD while Erik Ernst of Wisconsin Public Television has called his productions "some of the most important documentaries ever to air on public television".

He is currently working on a new film, Semper Fidelis (working title), which follows Elizabeth Perez, a US Marine veteran, as she fights to reunite her family after her husband, Marcos, is deported. The film is set to air late in 2018.

== Filmography ==
- Marcos Doesn't Live Here Anymore (2019)
- Kind Hearted Woman (2013)
- Country Boys (2006)
- The Farmer's Wife (1998)
- Down Around Here (1996)
- High Energy (1995)
- Out of Sight (1995)
- George Washington: The Man Who Wouldn't Be King (1992)
- The Kokbobiety School (1991)
- Feast of the Gods (1990)
- William C. Palmer (1989)
- Halftime: Five Yale Men at Mid-life (1989)
- Jack Levine: Feast of Pure Reason (1986)
- Paul Cadmus: Enfant Terrible at 80 (1986)
- Elizabeth at 94 (1985)
