= SV&E Subdivision =

Railway line in Kentucky

The SV&E Subdivision is a railroad line owned by CSX Transportation in the U.S. State of Kentucky. The line runs from Shelbiana, Kentucky to Dorton, Kentucky for a total of 17.6 miles (28.3 km). It was originally the Sandy Valley & Eastern Railroad, a line acquired by the Chesapeake and Ohio Railway, which eventually became part of CSX. At its north end the line branches off of the Big Sandy Subdivision and at its south end the line comes to an end.

== See also ==
- List of CSX Transportation lines
