= Judd Ehrlich =

American filmmaker

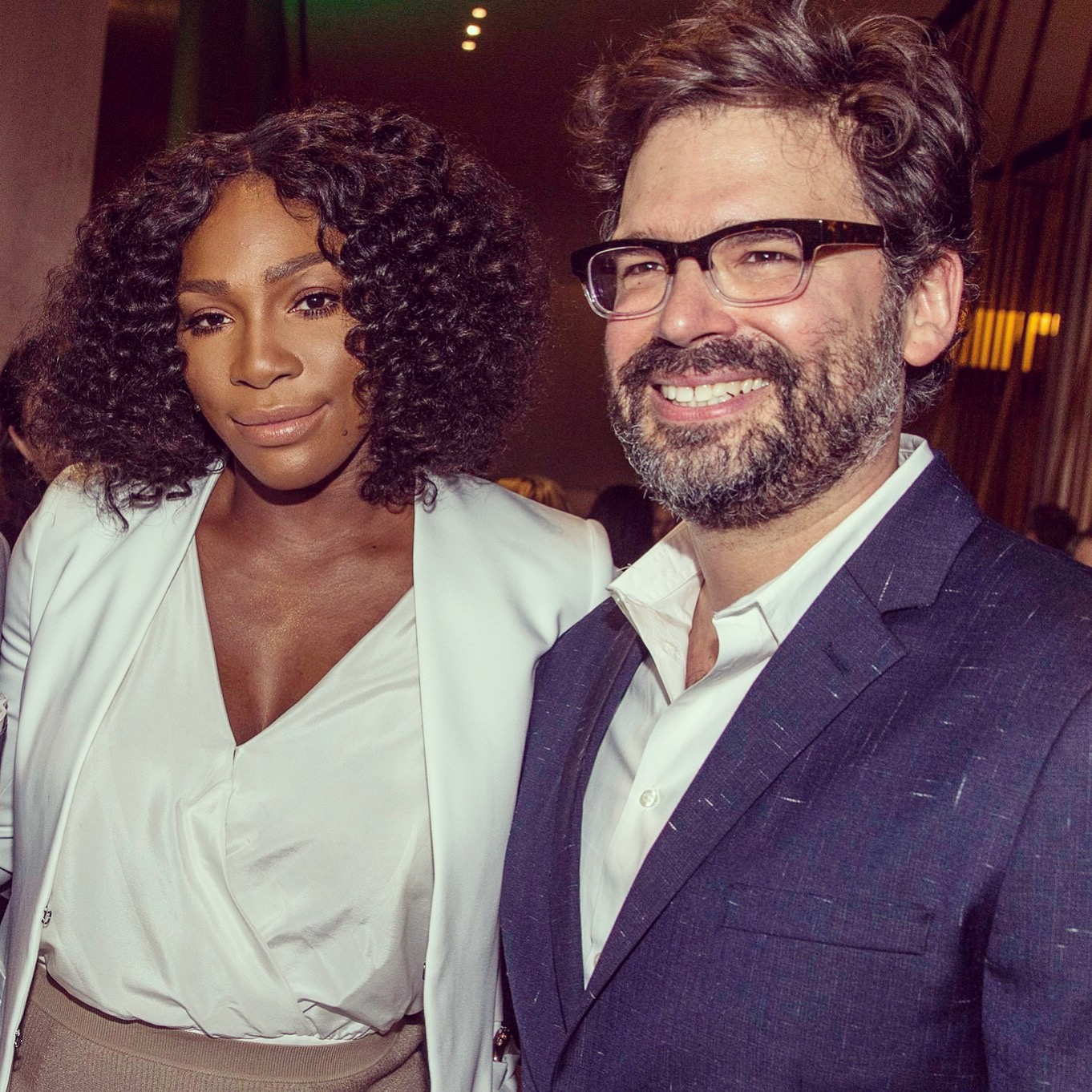
- Judd Ehrlich with Serena Williams at the 2016 Tribeca Film Festival premiere of Keepers of the Game
- Born: New York City, U.S.
- Education: Vassar College
- Occupations: Documentary film director, producer
- Years active: 1996–present

Judd Ehrlich is an American documentary film director and producer. He is known for directing We Could Be King (2014), The Price of Freedom (2021), and Jane Elliott Against the World (2026), which premiered at the 2026 Sundance Film Festival. His films have screened at festivals including Tribeca and Sundance and have aired on CNN, ESPN, and ABC.

== Early life and education ==
Ehrlich was born in New York City and graduated from Vassar College. Before directing his own features, he worked in social services in New York City. He created and curated film series at the Brooklyn Academy of Music, the Brooklyn Museum, and the JCC Manhattan.

== Career ==
Ehrlich began his career in documentary as an editor. He collaborated on the editing of Macky Alston's Family Name, a Sundance Film Festival award winner, and Ric Burns's PBS series New York, and later worked for the POV series and edited for CBS News.

He directed Mayor of the West Side in 2006, followed by Run for Your Life, a portrait of New York City Marathon founder Fred Lebow, which premiered at the Tribeca Film Festival. He followed Run for Your Life with Magic Camp (2012), set at the Tannen's Magic Camp he had attended as a child.

In 2014, Ehrlich directed We Could Be King, which follows two rival Philadelphia high school football programs forced together after school closures and budget cuts. Made in partnership with Tribeca Digital Studios and the Dick's Sporting Goods Foundation, the film aired on ESPN and ABC and won the Sports Emmy Award for Outstanding Sports Documentary. It was also selected for the American Film Showcase, a cultural exchange program of the United States Department of State. Reviewing the film for The New York Times, Daniel M. Gold compared its storytelling to Friday Night Lights.

Ehrlich went on to co-direct the short documentary Notes from Liberia with cinematographer Ryo Murakami and directed Keepers of the Game, which follows a girls' lacrosse team from the Haudenosaunee Confederacy. Keepers of the Game premiered at the Tribeca Film Festival, was named a New York Times Critic's Pick, and later aired on ABC. Like We Could Be King, it was selected for the American Film Showcase.

He later directed The Price of Freedom, a documentary about the National Rifle Association and the politics of guns in America. The film premiered at the 2021 Tribeca Festival and was acquired by CNN Films. It was produced by Tribeca Studios and Flatbush Pictures, marking the companies' third collaboration. The New York Times described the film as tracing the history of the National Rifle Association and the growing radicalization of its rhetoric.

In 2026, Ehrlich directed Jane Elliott Against the World, a documentary about educator Jane Elliott, which premiered at the 2026 Sundance Film Festival. It was acquired by the PBS documentary series Independent Lens to air as part of its 28th season. It went on to win Best Documentary at the Bentonville Film Festival, along with audience awards at the Boulder, Cleveland, and Sonoma international film festivals.

== Accolades ==
Ehrlich's films have received recognition including a Sports Emmy Award and a Grand Clio for We Could Be King; a Sports Emmy nomination, a Critics Choice Documentary Award nomination, and a Bronze Entertainment Lion at Cannes for Keepers of the Game; and New York Emmy nominations for Mayor of the West Side and Run for Your Life.

== Filmography ==
=== As director ===
- Mayor of the West Side (2006)
- Run for Your Life (2008)
- Magic Camp (2012)
- We Could Be King (2014)
- Notes from Liberia (2015; co-directed with Ryo Murakami)
- Keepers of the Game (2016)
- Father K (2018; short documentary)
- The Price of Freedom (2021)
- Jane Elliott Against the World (2026)

=== Television (as director) ===
- Hell Week (2014)
- Sports Matter: Salmon River Lacrosse (2015)
- Tough Mudder: The Challenge Within (2017)
- Tough Mudder: Tougher Together (2018)
- 26th Street Garage: The FBI's Untold Story of 9/11 (2021)

=== As producer and executive producer ===
- Don't Be Nice (2018, executive producer)
- Ainu Mosir (2020, executive producer)
- Oh, Canada (2024, co-executive producer)
- Remaining Native (2025, producer)
