= List of presidents of Luther College =

The following list of people have served as president of Luther College, a private liberal arts college located in Decorah, Iowa. The current president is Brad Chamberlain.

Presidents	Presidential years
Peter Laurentius Larsen	1861–1902
Christian Keyser Preus	1902–1921
Oscar L. Olson	1921–1932
Ove J. H. Preus	1932–1948
J. W. Ylvisaker	1948–1962
Elwin D. Farwell	1963–1981
H. George Anderson	1982–1995
Jeffrey D. Baker	1996–1999
Richard L. Torgerson	1999–2013
Paula J. Carlson	2014–2019
Jenifer K. Ward	2019–2025
Brad Chamberlain	2025–present
