= Wartburg Choir =

Choir at Wartburg College, Iowa, United States

The Wartburg Choir is a select auditioned a cappella choir from Wartburg College in Waverly, Iowa. Founded in 1937, the choir became one of the first American college groups to tour Europe. The Wartburg Choir performs sacred music from all historical periods and styles and often premieres new works by contemporary composers. Called a "mighty fortress of skill" by The Washington Post, it is one of four musical ensembles that tour internationally on a triennial basis. Beyond national and international tours, the Wartburg Choir has received invitations for special appearances in the United States and abroad.

== Travel and performance ==
The Wartburg Choir tours annually throughout the United States and has made showings at many major music centers and concert halls in the country, including the Kennedy Center in Washington, D.C.; Avery Fisher Hall of Lincoln Center, New York City; Carnegie Hall in New York City; Symphony Center in Chicago; and Orchestra Hall in Minneapolis, MN. The choir has competed in the Cork International Choral Festival in Cork, Ireland on two separate occasions and is the only American choral group to win first place honors. The Wartburg Choir has been invited to perform at several national and divisional conventions of the American Choral Directors Association. In December 2011 the choir was invited to sing as a part of the White House Holiday Concert Series. As part of that trip to Washington, D.C., the choir also sang at the National Cathedral's Bethlehem Prayer Service, which was simulcast worldwide.

The Wartburg Choir travels internationally every 3 years and has performed in over 21 European countries, three Canadian provinces, Scandinavia, and South Africa. The choir has also performed with Simon Estes, a world-renowned opera star who also served as a distinguished professor and artist-in-residence at Wartburg College. Dr. Estes joined the choir on two international tours to South Africa, which included performances at the Simon Estes Music High School in Cape Town. In 2006, the choir performed with the Czech National Symphony Orchestra in Prague at the invitation of Maestro Paul Freeman, CNSO music director and chief conductor, who had attended a Wartburg Choir concert at Orchestra Hall in Chicago.

Not to forget one's roots, the choir performs a number of concerts on campus, including Christmas with Wartburg, the college's annual Christmas celebration.

== Directors ==
=== Dr. Edwin Liemohn ===
The Wartburg Choir was founded in 1937 by Dr. Edwin Liemohn. Dr. Edwin Liemohn directed the choir from 1937 to 1968. Liemohn was a student of F. Melius Christiansen, the founder of the St. Olaf Choir. Many credit Christiansen with founding the a cappella Lutheran choral tradition. During Liemohn's time with the choir he "set a high standard of choral excellence, initiated the first Christmas with Wartburg festival in 1947, began the tradition of national concert tours, and coordinated the choir's first international tour." "Liemohn found ways to give the choir a public face. Already in the 1940s there were radio broadcasts, originating from the college campus, featuring the choir — along with other music groups and, on occasion, speakers and lectures. During the choir's 1938 tour, a trip that took the choir through Illinois, the singers were featured for an hour on radio station WLS in Chicago."

=== Dr. James Fritschel ===
Dr. James Fritschel, directed the choir from 1968 to 1984, expanding its reputation for excellence and international exposure. Dr. James Fritschel was a student of Liemohn's and worked to put his own stamp on the choir beginning in 1968. "His singers toured Europe in 1974 and began the tradition of performing at the Wartburg Castle, the college's namesake in Eisenach, Germany. In 1980, the Wartburg Choir became the first American choral group to win first place at the International Choral Festival in Cork, Ireland. A prolific composer, Fritschel left a lasting mark on the Lutheran choral tradition." "A prolific composer, Fritschel left a lasting mark on the choir and college traditions with a disarmingly simple composition. Taking the text of a four-line poem, penned years earlier by college English professor (and American Lutheran Church poet laureate) Gustav J. Neumann, the composer set words to music of his own creation. For years this composition, In Thy Hand was offered as a benediction at Homecoming and Baccalaureate services."

=== Dr. Paul Torkelson ===
Dr. Paul Torkelson directed the choir from 1984 to 2009. Torkelson was a student of Dr. James Fritschel. During Torkelson's time with the choir he conducted the choir at nearly every major concert hall in the United States and led the group on numerous international tours. During this time the Wartbrug Choir gained international acclaim for their versatility and precision. The Washington Post described the choir as "a Mighty Fortress of Skill" in headlining a review of the 2004 Kennedy Center concert by music critic Cecelia Porter. She described the choir as "a chorus trained with rock-solid discipline...The choir has impeccable intonation and excellent diction." When the choir performed at Carnegie Hall in New York City, Torkelson received an unexpected telegram just before the performance. Weston Noble, then-director of the Luther College Nordic Choir and the dean of Lutheran choir conductors, sent a congratulatory message. The essence was that the Wartburg Choir was singing on that night for all of the nation's Lutheran college choirs. Wrote Noble, "You make us proud." During Torkelson's 2008-2009 sabbatical, Prof. Weston Noble, acclaimed director of choirs from Luther College, stepped in to conduct and teach The Wartburg Choir.

=== Dr. Lee Nelson ===
In 2009, Dr. Lee Nelson became the fourth director of the Wartburg Choir. "Under his leadership the Wartburg Choir amassed many new champions for the group. His efforts have increased the awareness and reputation of the choir. The group is in high demand for premieres of new compositions, and the choir continues to be praised by critics throughout the country where ever it appears. Dr. Nelson led the choir to the National American Choral Directors Association Conference in Minneapolis, Minnesota in 2017, where they were a featured choir. With other notable awards, the Wartburg Choir was given The American Prize in Choral Performance in May 2017. Since then, the Wartburg Choir has been receiving copious amounts of recognition and praise from choral professionals alike.

== Performance highlights ==
The Past 30 Years:

- 2017: The choir is invited to perform a solo concert at the 2017 National ACDA Convention in Minneapolis, MN.
- 2014: The choir is invited to give a solo concert at the 2014 North Central ACDA Convention in Des Moines, IA.
- 2011: The Wartburg Choir commissioned Norwegian composer Ola Gjeilo to write a new work called "Sacred Origins" with text by Charles Anthony Silvestri. In December, the choir performed at the White House and the National Cathedral in Washington, D.C.
- 2009: Weston Noble, renowned conductor of the Nordic Choir, became interim conductor of the Wartburg Choir and described one of the concerts on tour as "one of two GREATEST EXPERIENCES" of his entire 67-year teaching career.
- 2006: The choir performed at the Chicago Symphony Center as a part of its Midwest concert tour. Because of the success of this concert, the choir performed with the Czech National Orchestra in Prague in December over Christmas break.
- 2005: The choir was one of three invited to perform for the Iowa Choral Directors Association Weston Noble Endowment Fund Concert in Ames. In addition, the choir traveled throughout southern Europe and South Africa, performing at the Simon Estes School in Cape Town. The choir was also invited for an audience with Pope John Paul II, who passed two weeks prior to the start of the tour.
- 2004: Concert tour with opera star Simon Estes included performances in the John F. Kennedy Center for the Performing Arts in Washington, D.C., Orchestra Hall in Minneapolis, Minn. and a return performance at Avery Fisher Hall at New York City's Lincoln Center.
- 2002: Choir invited for an audience with Pope John Paul II in Rome. However, due to scheduling conflicts the concert did not occur. The concert in the Wartburg Castle was recorded for German National Radio.
- 2000: Invitation for a special event celebrating musical revolutions from Bach to Louis Armstrong. The choir and alumni choir were invited by Bishop Younan of the Evangelical Lutheran Church in Jordan to sing in Manger Square in Bethlehem on Christmas Eve. However, due to increased violence in the Middle East, the trip was cancelled.
- 1999: Iowa Public Television filmed the 1999 concert at the Wartburg Castle, which was later broadcast on public television stations throughout the United States.
- 1998: Performance at the National ACDA Convention in Minneapolis, Minn.
- 1991: Wartburg Choir performance in the Wartburg Castle is the first time a non-professional group is allowed to perform. Due to the fall of the Berlin Wall and the reunification of Germany, the choir was allowed to perform in the Great Hall for the first time in its history.
- 1994: Choir invited to perform at the International Choral Contest in Tolosa, Spain.
- 1993: Performance in Carnegie Hall, New York City
- 1992: Performance at the North Central ACDA Convention in Des Moines
- 1991: European tour included a formal concert in Notre Dame de Paris
- 1989: Performance in Carnegie Hall, New York City
- 1987: Performance at the National ACDA Convention in Minneapolis, Minn.
- 1980: First American choral group to win the International Trophy at the Cork International Folk Dance and Choral Festival, now known as the Fleischmann International Trophy Competition in Cork, Ireland.
- 1959 Wartburg Choir first European Tour covering six countries over six weeks.
