= Jonathan D. Campbell =

American composer and author

Jonathan D. Campbell DMA MSM
- Education: Luther College; Luther Seminary; North Dakota State University
- Era: Contemporary

Jonathan D. Campbell is an American composer, conductor and author. He is director of the Minnesota Renaissance Choir. His music compositions consist mostly of choral music, handbell music, and sacred music.

Campbell grew up in the American Pacific Northwest. He received a bachelor of arts degree from Luther College in 1998. While at Luther College, he studied conducting under Weston Noble and was a member of the Nordic Choir. He then attended Luther Seminary, studying with Anton Armstrong and Paul Westermeyer. He graduated in 2002 with a Master of Sacred Music degree. He later attended North Dakota State University from 2012-2015 graduating as a Doctor of Musical Arts.

Campbell has served as a professor at Augsburg University, Winona State University, and Pomona College. He is a member of the American Choral Director’s Association, Association of the Lutheran Church Musicians, and American Composer’s Forum.

In 2026, Campbell published his first book, 'Railroads, Rifles, and Ruffians', a nonfiction about railroad worker and photographer John Milton Campbell in Colorado between 1901 and 1907. The book was praised by the Huerfano County based World Journal. Campbell held a book release tour, including visits to the Western Museum of Mining & Industry and the West Custer County Library.

== Works ==
=== Compositions ===
- They That Go Down to the Sea in Ships (2013)
- Dakota Summer: Scenes from the Prairie (2013)
- Jesus Christ Is Risen Today (2013)
- The Lone Wild Bird
- All for Christ (2015)
- The Final Harvest (2019)
- The Good Shepherd (2021)
- O Lord of Light: Nine Two-Part Mixed Anthems for the Church Year
- O Savior, Rend the Heavens Wide
- Come, Thou Long-Expected Jesus

=== Books ===
- Railroads, Rifles, and Ruffians : Tales from a Colorado Denver & Rio Grande Railroad Agent, 1901-1907 (2026)
