= Ryan Goessl =

American choral, orchestral conductor

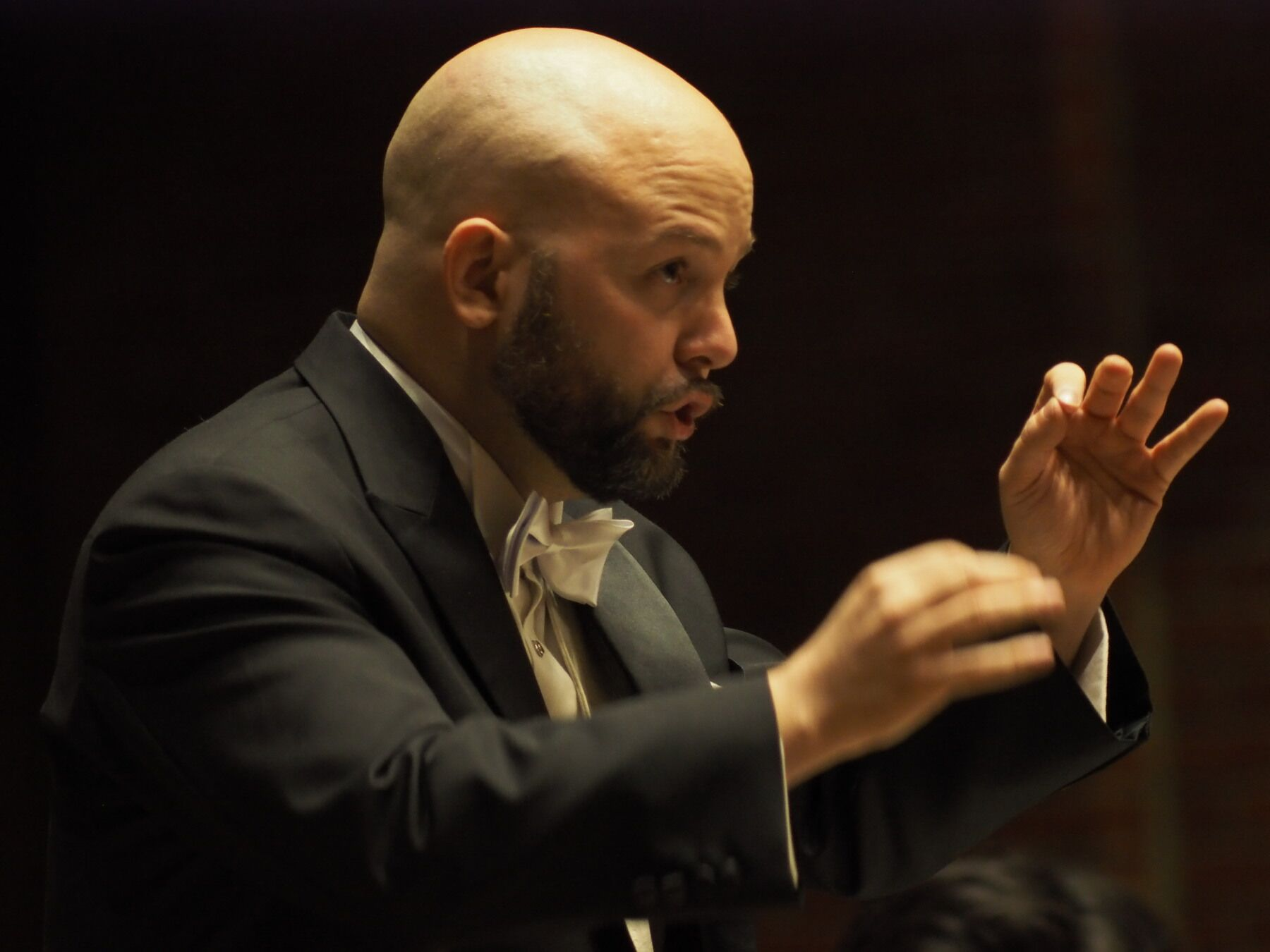
Dr. Ryan Goessl

Ryan Goessl is an American choral and orchestral conductor, residing in South Korea. He is the Executive and Artistic Director of the choirs and orchestra of Camarata Music. He is the conductor of the Camarata Chorale, Camarata Chamber Singers, and Camarata Chamber Orchestra. He also teaches private voice lessons and music appreciation, and oversees the entire organization. In addition to Camarata Music, Goessl has also been on the faculty as Assistant Professor of Music at Hongik University and at Hansei University, where, among teaching courses at the undergraduate and graduate level, he was the conductor of the Chapel Choirs.

In 2012, Camarata Music and Goessl were recognized for their commitment to choral music and culture in Korea by the former president of Korea, MyungBak Lee, and the Korean government.

In 2014, he assumed a new post as the Arts Ambassador for the Korea Business Leaders Association. In 2015, he was awarded by the Church of Jesus Christ of Latter-day Saints for his commitment to choral and sacred music to the country of Korea, and in 2018, has been awarded the "Honorary Citizen of Seoul" award by Mayor of Seoul, Won-soon Park, a prestigious award given to those who have shown their love and dedication to the city of Seoul. In 2021, he was appointed to the World Choir Council.

Ensembles under his leadership have sung over 300 performances throughout Korea, and have included members from 118 different countries. One of the most diverse music organizations worldwide, the choirs of Camarata Music regularly collaborate with governments from all over the world, represented in Korea, by performing for national days, cultural events, fundraisers and charitable functions, and various other performances, in collaboration with various embassies, governments, and ambassadors. In 2019, the Camarata Chamber Singers won the prestigious "Best of the Best" award at the National Presidential Choral Competition, in Daejeon, denoting them as the top non-professional mixed choir in Korea.Presidential Choral Competition

== Biography ==
A native of Medford, Wisconsin, Goessl developed a love for music at a young age by singing in church and at school. After earning a bachelor of arts in Vocal Performance from Luther College, where he sang under conductor Weston Noble, he attended the University of Southern California, specializing in Vocal Arts. He continued his studies at the esteemed Hansei University, where he studied conducting with the conductor of the Korea National Chorus, Eui-Joong Yoon, graduating in 2015. His dissertation on the Lutheran Choral Tradition has been widely accepted for its modern interpretation of the modern Lutheran Choral Tradition style.

Goessl is the resident conductor of the Camarata Music Company's "Chorale" and the auditioned "Chamber Singers", which received acclaim for their high level of artistry and conviction to the choral art, a role he assumed in 2009 when he formed the organization. Goessl is also the conductor of the Camarata Orchestra and Camarata Youth Choir.

Goessl is also frequently seen on stage in solo and stage performance, both in the realm of opera/classical voice, and musical theatre as a light lyric baritone. He has performed throughout the United States, Northern Europe, and Asia, and is known for his emotion and artistry in performance. He has more than 50 roles in his repertoire, and frequently performs in concert.

In addition to his role with Camarata Music, Goessl is sought after as a choral clinician, judge, teacher, and vocal coach. He is also the CEO of Korea Concert Tours, providing full-scale concert tours and performances throughout all of Eastern Asia.
