= Dog Eat Dog (role-playing game) =

Tabletop role-playing game

A Game of Imperialism and Assimilation in the Pacific Islands
- Designers: Liam Liwanag Burke
- Publication: 2012
- Genres: tabletop role-playing game

Dog Eat Dog is a tabletop role-playing game by Liam Liwanag Burke about the struggles between an island's colonizers and indigenous peoples. The wealthiest player in real life must play as all colonizing forces. The game won an Indie RPG Award.

== Gameplay ==
Character creation begins by collaboratively creating a general description of the colonizers and natives. Next, by disclosing their real-life wealth, the players determine who among them is the richest; the player with the most money becomes responsible for all colonizing forces in the game. Native players choose defining characteristics.

Players have asymmetrical power within a token economy. The game begins with the rule that the natives are inferior to the colonizers. The colonizing player begins with more tokens, may enter a scene at any time, and may arbitrarily disregard the results of dice rolls. The colonizer may give natives tokens for obedience or take them away for disobedience. Losing all tokens results in character death. Natives may create new rules amongst themselves to cope with the situation.

== Reception ==
Dog Eat Dog won the 2012 Indie RPG Award for "Most Innovative Game".

Shut Up & Sit Down compared its goal of social justice education to the board game Freedom: The Underground Railroad and emphasized its encouragement of player discomfort, writing, "It's such a good game. I'm still thinking about and being unsettled by it a week later. In fact, I'd say it's probably the best game I never want to play again."

Walton Wood for Wyrd Science Magazine wrote:

Dog Eat Dog’s mechanics elegantly render the struggle between a colonial force and subjugated people using only some tokens, a few dice, and conversation. Like Paul Zimbardo’s Stanford Prison Experiment or Jane Elliott's Blue Eyes / Brown Eyes exercise, it places ordinary people in a simulation of arbitrarily imbalanced power and privilege, illuminating invisible perspectives and socio-political positions. By experiencing them, we begin to discern the workings of injustice and, hopefully, points of intervention that can lead to change.

== Publication history ==
Dog Eat Dog was independently published in 2012 after raising $6,704 on Kickstarter.
