= Elwin D. Farwell =

Sixth President of Luther College in Decorah, Iowa

Elwin D. Farwell was the sixth President of Luther College in Decorah, Iowa.

== Early life ==
Elwin D. Farwell was born on May 1, 1919, in Branch County, Michigan. He graduated from Michigan State University in 1943 with a degree in animal husbandry, and enlisted in the army, serving through 1946, being discharged as a captain.

Farwell went on to earn a master's degree in animal breeding in 1947. He then taught in the agriculture college at Michigan State from 1947 to 1955. Farwell later graduated from Pacific Lutheran Theological Seminary in 1959 with a Doctorate in Education.

== Career ==
From 1959 to 1961, Farwell served as pastor at Salem Lutheran Church in Andrew, Iowa. In 1961, he began serving as academic dean at California Lutheran College in Thousand Oaks, California.

=== President of Luther College ===
On August 21, 1962, the Luther College Board of Regents elected Farwell as the sixth president of Luther College. Farwell took office on May 1, 1963. He was the first president who had no Norwegian heritage, and the first non-alumni president since Luther's first president, Peter Laurentius Larsen. Enrollment increased under Farwell's presidency, because he focused on recruiting students outside of the traditional Scandinavian-Lutheran background. After just four years in office, Luther's enrollment had grown to 2,000 students, compared to about 1,215 students under his predecessor. Several building projects occurred during Farwell's tenure, including the new Field House in 1964, Ylvisaker Hall in 1964, Dieseth Hall in 1966, Miller Hall in 1968, Preus Library in 1969, and the Center for Faith and Life in 1977. Farwell retired in 1981.

After his retirement, Farwell served as interim president at Dana College in Blair, Nebraska, for 15 months.

== Personal life ==
Farwell married Helen Irene Hill in 1942. Together, they had four children. Farwell died on May 5, 2017.

Over his life, he has received the King Olav V of Norway Award, Knight First Class Order of St. Olav, and the King of Sweden Award, Knight First Class Order of North Star.

== Legacy ==
Farwell Hall, a dormitory at Luther College built in 1991, was named for Elwin D. Farwell.

Luther also maintains the Farwell Distinguished Lecture Series, which is funded by the Elwin and Helen Farwell Lecture Endowment.
