= The Price of Freedom =

The Price of Freedom may refer to:

- The Price of Freedom (1975 film), or Operation Daybreak, an American war film
- The Price of Freedom (2021 film), an American documentary film
- The Price of Freedom (role-playing game), a 1986 game designed by Greg Costikyan
- Wing Commander IV: The Price of Freedom, a 1996 computer game
- Pirates of the Caribbean: The Price of Freedom, a 2011 novel by Ann C. Crispin
- Price of Freedom, a non-governmental organization founded by Lesya Orobets
