= Ylvisaker =

Ylvisaker is a surname. Notable people with the surname include:

- Don Ylvisaker (1933–2022), American mathematical statistician
- J. W. Ylvisaker (1900–1981), American college president
- Jeremy Ylvisaker, American multi-instrumentalist
- William T. Ylvisaker (1924–2010), American businessman and polo player

== See also ==
- Ylvis, a Norwegian comedy duo consisting of Vegard and Bård Ylvisåker
