= A Class Divided =

- Frontline episode
- Episode no.: Season 3 Episode 9
- Directed by: William Peters
- Written by: Charlie Cobb; William Peters
- Production code: PBS
- Original air date: March 26, 1985

"A Class Divided" is a 1985 episode of the PBS series Frontline. Directed by William Peters, the episode profiles the Iowa schoolteacher Jane Elliott and her class of third graders, who took part in a class exercise about discrimination and prejudice in 1970 and reunited in the present day to recall the experience.

== Background and episode summary ==
"I watched what had been marvelous, cooperative, wonderful, thoughtful children turn into nasty, vicious, discriminating, little third-graders in a space of fifteen minutes."

— Jane Elliott in "A Class Divided" recalling her 1970 experiment

In 1968, following the assassination of Martin Luther King Jr., Jane Elliott tried discussing issues of discrimination, racism, and prejudice with her third grade class in Riceville, Iowa. Not feeling that the discussion was getting through to her class, who did not normally interact with minorities in their rural town, Mrs. Elliott began a two-day "Blue Eyes/Brown Eyes" exercise to reinforce the unfairness of discrimination and racism: Students with blue eyes were given preferential treatment, given positive reinforcement, and made to feel superior over those with brown eyes for one day; the procedure was reversed the next day, with Mrs. Elliott giving favorable preference to brown-eyed students. As a result, whichever group was favored by Elliott performed enthusiastically in class, answered questions quickly and accurately, and performed better in tests; those who were discriminated against felt more downcast, were hesitant and uncertain in their answers, and performed poorly in tests.

William Peters became interested in Mrs. Elliott after reading an article about her work in The New York Times and arranged soon afterward to film the class. The resulting footage would become The Eye of the Storm, which originally aired on ABC in 1970. Peters was surprised by the change he observed in the children and remarked at how disinterested they were with the cameras, because they were so involved in the exercise that they had no idea they were being filmed.

"A Class Divided" picks up the story in August 1984, with Peters following up on Mrs. Elliott and eleven of the now-grown children, who reunite during their high-school reunion. At their request, the former students and Mrs. Elliott together rewatch The Eye of the Storm. Scenes from that original film are interspersed with the participants' present-day reactions and anecdotes. As Charlie Cobb notes in his narration, the get-together is Mrs. Elliott's first chance to find out how much of the lesson her students retained. The students recall in interviews their memories of their feelings at the time of the film, including that of shame and anger when wearing the blue identifying collars (Mrs. Elliott employed them to easily identify the group being discriminated against) as well as that of elation and superiority when they shed the collars. The now-adults agree, as they had learned after the 1970 experiment, that racism and prejudice are wrong, and that the life-affecting lesson should be experienced by other children, teachers, and adults in the present day as a form of understanding.

"A Class Divided" confirms that Mrs. Elliott has continued her "Blue Eyes/Brown Eyes" experiment in the present day, though there has been little outward reaction from parents or school authorities in Riceville. "A Class Divided" also demonstrates that The Eye of the Storm and the lessons it demonstrates have been widely used in other schools, government, the business world, and correctional systems across the country. The latter is evidenced by scenes in New York's Green Haven Correctional Facility, where Eye is shown to a class taught by a sociology professor, and in Iowa, where Mrs. Elliott is shown presenting her "Blue Eyes/Brown Eyes" lesson to employees of the state's corrections department.

== Cast ==
- Jane Elliott and members of her 1970 3rd grade class as themselves
- Charlie Cobb as himself (correspondent for Frontline)
- Judy Woodruff as herself (Frontline anchor)

== Awards and follow-up ==
Frontline's presentation of "A Class Divided" earned PBS an Emmy Award in 1986 for Outstanding Informational, Cultural or Historical Programming" (program length).

William Peters would follow up "A Class Divided" with the book A Class Divided: Then and Now (Yale University, 1987), which expanded on the topics and thoughts displayed in both "A Class Divided" and The Eye of the Storm.

== See also ==
- Eye of the Storm, the original 1970 film that document Mrs. Elliott and her class
