= Jeffrey D. Baker =

American pilot and Lutheran (1941–1999)

Jeffrey D. Baker was the eighth President of Luther College in Decorah, Iowa.

== Early life ==
Baker was born on November 23, 1941, in Sacramento, California. In 1964, he received a degree in international affairs from the United States Air Force Academy in Colorado Springs, Colorado, and married Shirly Watson in Colorado Springs. He then served six years in the United States Air Force as a pilot and instructor pilot.

Baker later received a Master's of Business Administration in 1979 from Arizona State University Tempe campus, and a Doctorate in Economics in 1979 from the University of North Carolina, Chapel Hill. Baker was then a student at the Foreign Service Institute in Washington, D.C., from 1980 to 1981, and air attache at the American Embassy in Rangoon, Burma from 1981 to 1983.

== Career ==
In 1983, Baker became the assistant dean for graduate programs and continuing education for the Defense Intelligence College in Washington. He then worked as an associate professor of business and economics at Carroll College in Helena, Montana, from 1984 to 1987. He served for a year in 1987 as associate director and associate professor at the Patterson School of Diplomacy and International Commerce at the University of Kentucky, before moving back to Carroll College, where he became the vice president for academic affairs and the college dean from 1988 to 1993.

From 1993 to 1996, Baker served as the commissioner of higher education for the Montana University System, and as president of the Montana Higher Education Student Assistance Corporation.

=== President of Luther College ===
In 1996, the Luther College Board of Regents elected Jeffrey Baker as the eighth president of Luther College, inaugurated on November 23, 1996.

In spring of 1998, Baker launched a strategic planning process, resulting in plans for new campus buildings, including the Center for the Arts, an addition onto Jenson Hall of Music, new townhouse-style student housing, the Legends Fitness for Life Fitness Center, and a renovation of the cafeteria. During the homecoming festivities in 1998, Baker also unveiled a new $100 million fundraising campaign, called "The Leadership for a New Century." On June 12, 1998, Baker announced that he was diagnosed with lung cancer and a second cancer in his back. He resigned as president on March 19, 1999, at the very end of the decennial reaccreditation visit by the North Central Association.

He moved to Cambria, California, on March 20, 1999, and died two days later on March 22.

== Legacy ==
All of the building projects of which planning was underway during Baker's presidency were seen through by his successor. The townhome-style student housing project was named Baker Village in his honor, dedicated in 1999.
