= Camarata Music Company =

South Korea–based non-profit music organization

- Choir
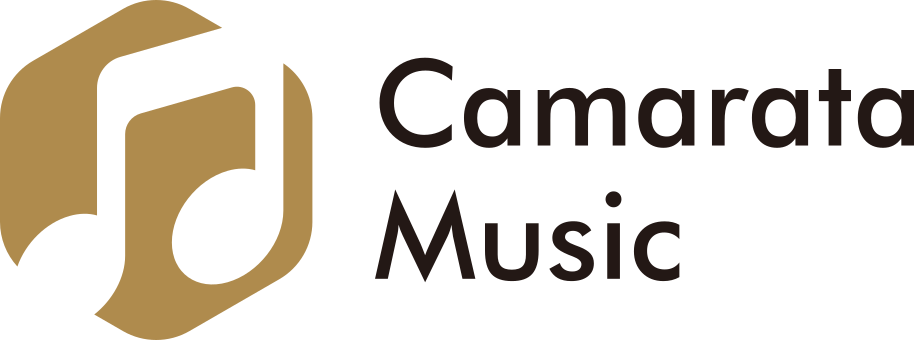
- Camarata Music Logo
- Origin: Seoul, South Korea
- Founded: 2009
- Genre: Classical, baroque, romantic, religious, contemporary, acapella, musical theater
- Music director: Dr. Ryan Goessl
- Website: camaratamusic.org

Camarata Music Company, now known as Camarata Music, is an international non-profit music organization in Seoul, South Korea. It was created for both native Koreans and foreign expatriates. Camarata currently consists of five musical ensembles: the Camarata Chorale, Camarata Chamber Singers, Camarata Junior Choir, Camarata Youth Choir, and Camarata Orchestra. Camarata Music is currently led by its founder and Music Director, Dr. Ryan Goessl. To date, Camarata has performed over 300 concerts since its founding. It has members from more than 106 countries.

== Camarata Chorale ==
The 120-plus member Chorale is Camarata's largest and core group. This ensemble is open to any adult singer, regardless of previous experience. The Chorale performs three major concerts per year. In recent years, the Chorale has performed classical works including Brahms Ein deutsches Requiem, J.S. Bach's Mass in B Minor, Beethoven's Mass in C, Mozart's Requiem, Durufle's Requiem, Schubert's Mass in G Major, and Mendelssohn's Elijah. As a holiday tradition, the Chorale traditionally performed Handel's Messiah for its winter concert in December, until 2016. In 2017, the Camarata Music Company, featuring all choirs, introduced their new, yearly concert, "Christmas with Camarata". The event is a popular Seoul event, consistently attracting over 2,500 attendees. In 2010, the choir was led in performance of Handel's Messiah by guest conductor, Weston Noble.

== Camarata Chamber Singers ==
The Chamber Singers is a smaller, auditioned choir, with up to 32 members. The Chamber Singers perform two major concerts per year, and sing music of all eras and styles. They have performed as featured guests for such organizations as the British Chamber of Commerce in Korea (BCCK), numerous foreign ambassadors to Korea, and Korean President Lee Myung-bak in 2011. They have also commissioned choral works for Korean and international composers. The Chamber Singers also perform at up to twenty smaller events throughout the year. They have collaborated with visiting ensembles such as Brigham Young University’s Wind Symphony, Plymouth State University’s Chamber Singers, Changwon City Chorus, Suwon Civic Chorale, Yoon Hakwon Chorus, and the National Chorus of Korea. The Chamber Singers often perform for the National Day and special celebrations of many embassies and ambassadors. In 2019, the Chamber Singers won the "Best of the Best" award at the prestigious National Presidential Choral Competition, denoting them as the top non-professional mixed choir in Korea.

== Camarata Youth Choirs ==
Camarata’s newest ensembles are its Junior and Youth Choirs, established in 2015. These ensembles are open for any English-speaking child ages 5-14. At present, over 40 different nationalities have been represented in the Youth Choirs. The Youth Choirs provide a musical learning opportunity for children of all nations, and an opportunity to meet other children from around the world. In addition to their own concert at the end of each session, the Youth Choirs are also featured at one of the Chorale’s major concerts during the year.

== Camarata Orchestra ==
The Camarata Orchestra is an ensemble of professional musicians from around the world. The Orchestra accompanies the Camarata Chorale during the regular Chorale concerts throughout the year, and also performs its own repertoire. Recent performances by the Camarata Orchestra include: Mozart's Piano Concerto No. 20 in D Minor, K. 466, Beethoven's Piano Concerto no. 1 in C Major, Lussier's Bacchanale, and Bach Suite No. 3 in D major, BWV 1068.

== Musical Theatre Program ==
Camarata also produces an annual orchestra-backed spring musical theater production. Recent productions have included Cinderella, The Wizard of Oz, Rogers and Hammerstein’s Oklahoma!, Menken and Ashman's Little Shop of Horrors, Ahrens and Flaherty's Seussical, and Gilbert and Sullivan's The Pirates of Penzance. 2017 will see Rogers and Hammerstein's Cinderella come to the stage. All performances are in English, with projected Korean subtitles.
