= Blue Eyed =

1996 film

- Film poster
- Directed by: Bertram Verhaag
- Written by: Bertram Verhaag
- Starring: Jane Elliott
- Release date: November 21, 1996 (Germany)
- Running time: 90 minutes
- Country: Germany

Blue Eyed is a 1996 documentary film by Bertram Verhaag in which Jane Elliott is teaching a workshop on racism.
