= Center for Faith and Life =

Coordinates: 43.3129°N 91.8053°W

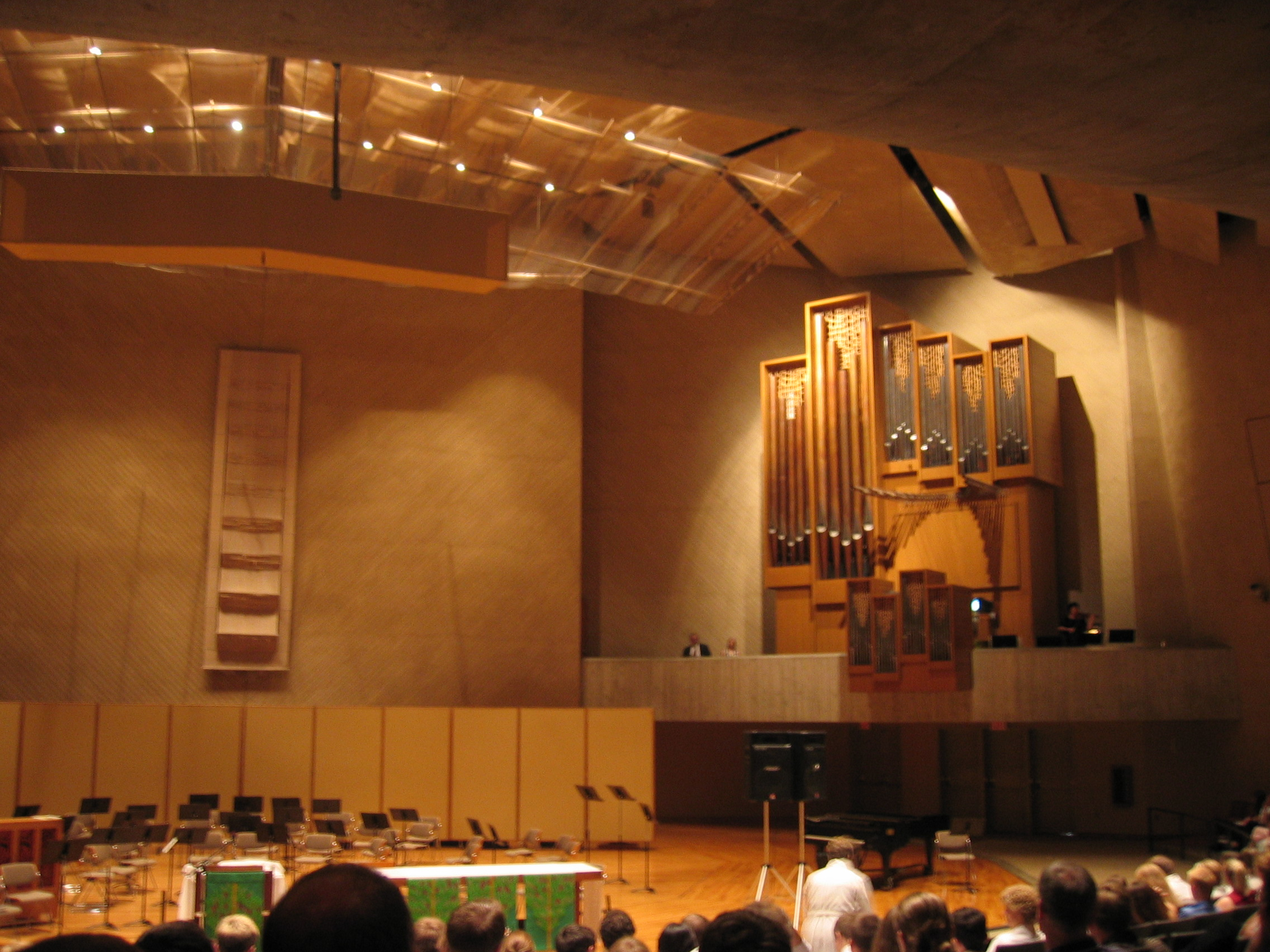
The Center for Faith and Life interior

The Center for Faith and Life is an auditorium located on the campus of Luther College in Decorah, Iowa, United States.

== Construction & configuration ==
The Center for Faith and Life was conceived in the 1970s. Luther's previous venue for performance, the C.K. Preus Gymnasium (which also was home to indoor Luther athletics, plus other student activities), was destroyed by fire in 1961. Music ensemble performances had taken place in other locations on-campus and in Decorah, settling in The Fieldhouse (now Regents Center) upon its completion in 1964. The design process for the Center for Faith and Life began in the early 1970s, with initial plans calling for 2,500 seats, plus classrooms & faculty offices. The scope was later scaled back to its present design of approximately 1,500 seats plus limited office space. The final design was presented in February, 1974, and groundbreaking occurred on March 24, 1975, on the former site of the Preus Gymnasium. The Center for Faith and Life was dedicated on October 16, 1977, though additional construction continued through 1978.

Capacity stands at 1,428, with flexibility for overflow seating. Seating closest to the stage is located on a thrust stage, which can be raised to create additional stage area. A full-size organ is featured in the balcony to the right of the stage.

== Venue ==
Having opened in 1977, the auditorium is used primarily for music performances, including most on-campus performances by the Luther Music Department's student ensembles. The nationally-televised "Christmas at Luther" concerts are held each year at the venue. Campus ministry and daily chapel services, plus Sunday chapel services, are also located at the Center for Faith and Life.

In addition to housing the "Christmas At Luther" (formerly "Juletide") concerts held annually since 1981, many lectures are delivered at the center and the venue has also hosted concerts from American and international artists through its Center Stage Series. On February 6, 1996, the center hosted a performance by Dave Matthews and Tim Reynolds, which would be released as the album Live at Luther College three years later.

== See also ==
- List of concert halls
