= Jane Elliott =

American diversity educator (born 1933)

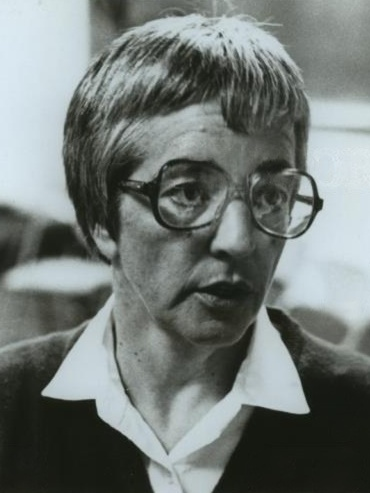
- Elliott in 1985
- Born: Jane Jennison; November 30, 1933 (age 92); Riceville, Iowa, U.S.
- Occupations: Anti-racism activist, diversity educator
- Years active: 1968–present
- Known for: "Blue Eyes/Brown Eyes" exercise
- Spouse: Darald Elliott (m. 1955; died 2013)
- Children: 4
- Website: janeelliott.com

Jane Elliott (née Jennison; born November 30, 1933) is an American diversity educator. As a schoolteacher, Elliott became known for the "Blue Eyes/Brown Eyes" exercise she created to teach students about the effects of discrimination and racial stereotyping. She first conducted the exercise with her third-grade class (Note: Third graders are usually eight or nine years old.) on April 5, 1968, the day after the assassination of Martin Luther King Jr. The local newspaper's publication of compositions that the children had written about the experience led to much broader media interest in it.

The classroom exercise was filmed in 1970, becoming the documentary The Eye of the Storm. PBS series Frontline featured a reunion of the 1970 class, as well as Elliott's work with adults, in its 1985 episode "A Class Divided". Invitations to speak and to conduct her exercise eventually led Elliott to give up school teaching and to become a full-time public speaker against discrimination. She has directed the exercise and lectured on its effects in many places throughout the world. She also has conducted the exercise with college students, as seen in the 2001 documentary The Angry Eye.

== Early life and career ==
Elliott was born in 1933 to Lloyd and Margaret (Benson) Jennison on her family's farm in or near Riceville, Iowa. She was the fourth of several children.

In 1952, after graduating from high school, Elliott attended the Iowa State Teachers College (now the University of Northern Iowa), where she attained an emergency elementary teaching certificate in five quarters. In 1953, she began teaching in a one-room school in Randall.

== Motivation to teach about racism's effects ==
On the evening of April 4, 1968, Elliott turned on her television and learned of the assassination of Martin Luther King Jr. She says she vividly remembers a scene in which a white reporter pointed his microphone toward a local black man and asked "When our leader was killed several years ago, his widow held us together. Who's going to control your people?"

Elliott then decided to combine a lesson she had planned about Native Americans with a lesson she had planned about Martin Luther King Jr. for February's Hero of the Month project. At the moment she was watching the news of King's death, Elliott says she was ironing a teepee for use in a lesson unit about Native Americans. To tie the two lessons together, she used the Sioux prayer "Oh great spirit, keep me from ever judging a man until I have walked in his moccasins. [sic]" She wanted to give her small-town, all-white students the experience of walking in a "colored child's moccasins for a day".

== First exercise involving eye color ==
The first child to arrive in Elliott's classroom on the day following Martin Luther King, Jr.'s assassination asked, in reference to the incident, "Why'd they shoot that King?" After the rest of the class arrived, Elliott asked them how they thought it would feel to be a black boy or girl. She suggested to the class it would be hard for them to understand discrimination without experiencing it themselves and then asked the children if they would like to find out. The children agreed. She decided to base the exercise on eye color rather than skin color to show the children what racial segregation would be like.

Initially, there was resistance among the students in the minority group to the idea that blue-eyed children were better than brown-eyed children. To counter this, Elliott led the children to believe the false premise that melanin was linked to their higher intelligence and learning ability. Shortly thereafter, the initial resistance fell away. Those who were deemed "superior" became arrogant, bossy, and otherwise unpleasant to their "inferior" classmates. Their grades on simple tests improved, and they completed mathematical and reading tasks that had seemed outside their ability before. The "inferior" classmates also transformed – into timid and subservient children who scored more poorly on tests, and even during recess isolated themselves, including those who had previously been dominant in the class. These children's academic performance suffered, even with tasks that had been simple before.

The next Monday, Elliott reversed the exercise, making the brown-eyed children superior. While the brown-eyed children did taunt the blue-eyed children in ways similar to what had occurred the previous day, Elliott reports it was much less intense. To reflect on the experience, she asked the children to write down what they had learned.

== Reactions and public attention ==
The compositions the children wrote about the experience were printed in the Riceville Recorder on page 4 on April 18, 1968, under the headline "How Discrimination Feels", and the story was picked up by the Associated Press. As a result of the article, Elliott was invited to appear on The Tonight Show Starring Johnny Carson. After she spoke about her exercise in a short interview segment, the audience reaction was instant as hundreds of calls came into the show's telephone switchboard, many of them negative. An often-quoted letter stated, "How dare you try this cruel experiment out on white children? Black children grow up accustomed to such behavior, but white children, there's no way they could possibly understand it. It's cruel to white children and will cause them great psychological damage."

The publicity Elliott was getting did not make her popular in Riceville. When she walked into the teachers' lounge the day after her Tonight Show appearance, several other teachers walked out. When she went downtown to do errands, she heard whispers. When her oldest daughter went to the girls' bathroom in junior high, she came out of a stall to see a hateful message scrawled in red lipstick for her on the mirror. In a 2003 interview, Elliot said that about 20% of the Riceville community was still furious with her over what she did that day in 1968 and that some of those still called her "n-word lover", but that she was grateful for the other 80%.

As news of her exercise spread, Elliott appeared on more television shows and started to repeat the exercise in professional training days for adults. On December 15, 1970, Elliott staged the experience to adult educators at a White House Conference on Children and Youth.

In 1970, ABC produced a documentary about Elliott called The Eye of the Storm, which made her even more nationally known.

Subsequently, William Peters wrote two books—A Class Divided and A Class Divided: Then and Now—about her and the exercise. A Class Divided was adapted as a PBS Frontline documentary in 1985. It included a reunion of the schoolchildren featured in The Eye of the Storm, for which Elliott received The Hillman Prize.

A televised edition of the exercise was shown on Channel 4 on October 29, 2009, entitled The Event: How Racist Are You? This documentary was intended, according to the producers in their agreement with Jane Elliott, to create an awareness of the effects of racist behavior. After the exercise, Elliott said the result "wasn't as successful as I am accustomed to being". Journalist Andrew Anthony said he was left with the "nagging suspicion that she's more excited by white fear than she is by black success."

Elliott was featured by Peter Jennings on ABC as "Person of the Week" on April 24, 1992. She is listed on the timeline of 30 notable educators by textbook editor McGraw-Hill along with Confucius, Plato, Booker T. Washington, and Maria Montessori. She has been invited to speak at 350 colleges and universities and has appeared on The Oprah Winfrey Show five times.

In November 2016, Elliott's name was added to the BBC's annual list of 100 Women.

In 2026, Elliott was the subject of the documentary film Jane Elliott Against the World, which premiered at the 2026 Sundance Film Festival.

== Criticism ==
The journalist Stephen G. Bloom has written about a variety of criticisms of Elliott’s Blue Eyes/Brown Eyes experiment, including those who argued that it risked psychological harm to children, leaving some feeling humiliated or anxious; that the experiment raised ethical concerns since students were subjected to intense role-playing without informed consent or safeguards; that it oversimplified racism by reducing it to eye color, ignoring the deeper systemic and historical dimensions of prejudice; that it provoked community backlash, with parents and townspeople accusing Elliott of traumatizing children and embarrassing her hometown; and that the experiment left a mixed legacy in diversity training, as later workshops based on the exercise were sometimes described as coercive or intimidating rather than constructive.

In addition to these criticisms, Bloom noted that Elliott often cited Robert Coles as praising her Blue Eyes/Brown Eyes exercise, claiming he said it was “the greatest thing to come out of American education in a hundred years.” However, Bloom found no evidence for the validity of this quote, and has documented Coles' denial of ever making such a statement. From Bloom's perspective, this raised questions about Elliott’s credibility, since invoking Coles’ authority gave her experiment more legitimacy in academic and educational circles.

== Origin of workplace diversity training ==
Elliott is considered to be the forerunner of diversity training, with the Blue Eyes/Brown Eyes exercise as the basis of much of what is now called diversity training. She has done such training for corporations such as General Electric, Exxon, AT&T, and IBM, as well as lectured to the FBI, IRS, US Navy, US Department of Education, and US Postal Service.

The Riceville school system granted Elliott unpaid leave to conduct workshops and training that were based on her exercise to organizations outside of her school system. However, the increasing demands to be away from the classroom eventually caused problems with her public school teaching career. Elliott left teaching in the mid-1980s to devote herself full-time to diversity training, redeveloping her classroom exercise for the corporate world. This was promoted positively as a way to promote teamwork, profits, and a "winning together" atmosphere. For this corporate exercise, Elliott divides a multiracial group based on the color of their eyes and then subjects the blue-eyed individuals to a withering regime of humiliation and contempt. In only a few hours, Elliott's treatment makes the blue-eyed workers become distracted and despondent, stumbling over the simplest commands.

Companies found the idea of offering such training attractive, not only because in the 1970s and 1980s there were increasing numbers of people of color in their organizations, but also because of U.S. court rulings and federal policies to promote multiculturalism brought about by pressure from civil rights groups during the same two decades.

Many companies at that time came to see diversity training as a way to ward off negative legal action and publicity. Elliott said, "If you can't think of any other reason for getting rid of racism, think of it as a real money saver." Elliott-inspired diversity training has been used outside the United States. When the Race Relations Amendment Act 2000 passed in the United Kingdom, it listed 100 diversity training firms in the Diversity Directory. According to a survey by the Chartered Institute of Personnel and Development, 70% of those firms have diversity policies in which diversity training plays a major role. Many of these courses follow Elliott's model in regards to understanding the issues presented.

=== Academic research ===
Academic research into Elliott's exercise shows moderate results in reducing long-term prejudice but is inconclusive on the question of whether the possible psychological harm outweighs the potential benefits. Two professors of education in England, Ivor Goodson and Pat Sikes, argue that what Elliott did was unethical, calling the exercise psychologically and emotionally damaging. They also stated ethical concerns pertaining to the fact that the children were not told of the purpose of the exercise beforehand.

Measured results of the diversity training for adults are moderate. The outcomes of a 1990 research study by the Utah State University were that virtually all the subjects reported the experience was meaningful for them. However, the statistical evidence supporting the effectiveness of the activity for prejudice reduction was moderate; and virtually all the participants, as well as the simulation facilitator, reported stress from the simulation.

Another program evaluation in 2003, conducted by Tracie Stewart at the University of Georgia, showed white college students had significantly more positive attitudes toward Asian-American and Latino individuals, but only marginally more positive attitudes toward African-American individuals. In some courses, participants can feel frustrated about "their inability to change" and instead begin to feel anger against the very groups to which they are supposed to be more sensitive. It can also lead to anxiety because people become hyper-sensitive about being offensive or being offended. There appears to be a lack of very good measures for determining the long-term outcomes of these training initiatives.

In a 2003 study, Murdoch University included the Blue Eyes/Brown Eyes exercise in their list of "both successful and unsuccessful" strategies to reduce racism, as opposed to, among others, more successful strategies like dialogues about race, and the debunking of myths.

== Personal life ==
Elliott was married to Darald Elliott (1934–2013) from 1955 until his death, and she has four children. They maintained residences in Osage, Iowa and Sun City, California. On May 24, 2019, Jane Elliott was awarded the honorary degree Doctor of Humane Letters by CSU Bakersfield.

== In popular culture ==
Elliot and her experiment have been the subject of several documentaries and reenactments:

- The Eye of the Storm (1970)
- A Class Divided (Frontline, 1985)
- Blue Eyed (1996)
- The Angry Eye (2001)
- The Australian Eye (also known as The Stolen Eye; 2002)
- The Event: How Racist Are You? (Channel 4, 2009).
- Jane Elliott Against the World (2026)

== See also ==
- The Third Wave (experiment)
