= Koren Hall =

- Koren Library
- U.S. National Register of Historic Places
- U.S. Historic district – Contributing property
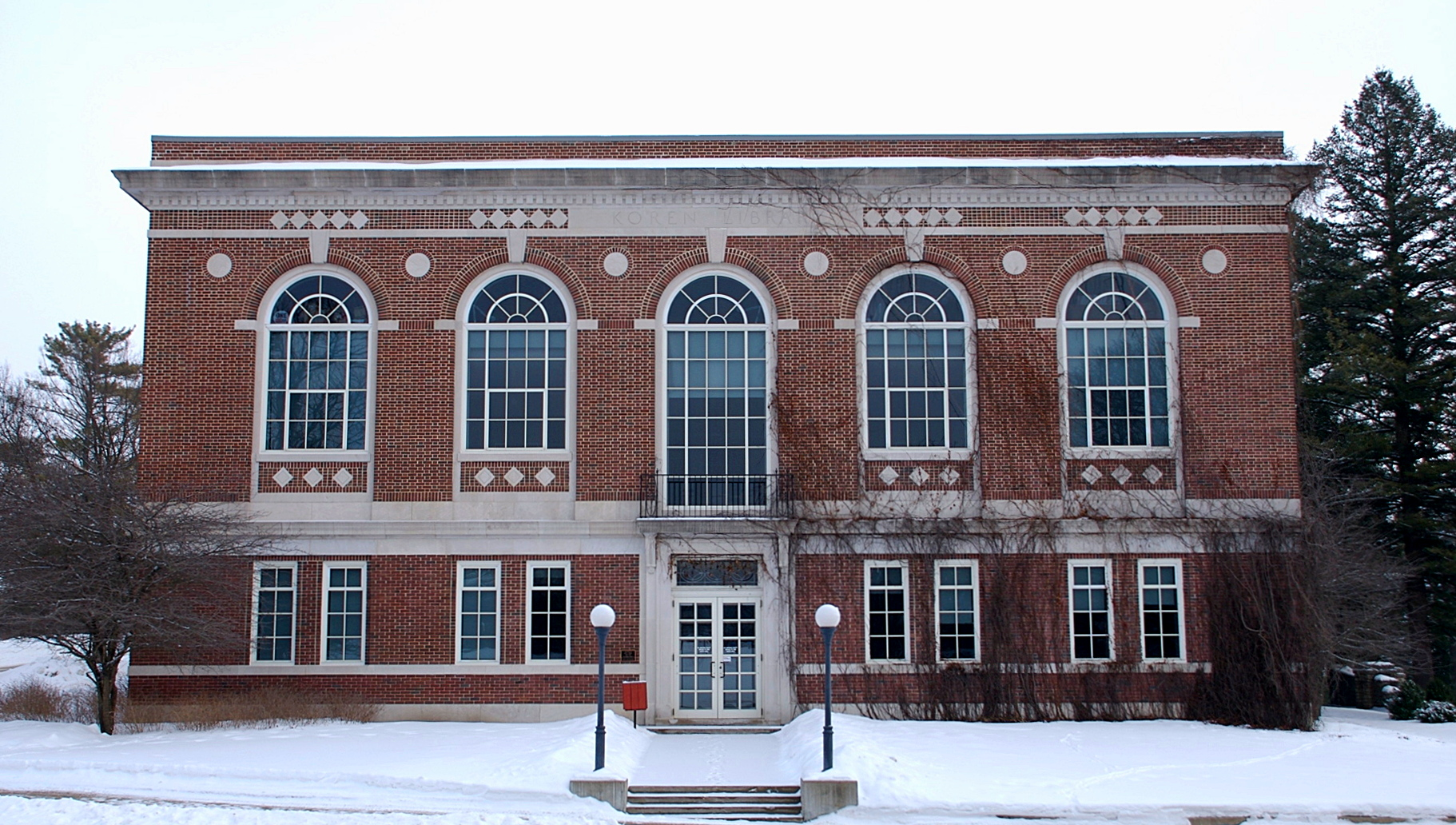

- Location within Iowa Location within the United States
- Location: Luther College campus Decorah, Iowa
- Coordinates: 43°18′38″N 91°48′14″W
- Built: 1921
- Architect: Magney & Tusler
- Architectural style: Classical Revival
- Part of: Luther College Campus Historic District (ID100006184)
- NRHP reference No.: 84001610
- Added to NRHP: January 12, 1984

Koren Hall, formerly known as Koren Library, is located on the campus of Luther College in Decorah, Iowa, United States. Completed in 1921, it served as the college's library until 1969 when Preus Library opened. Koren Hall was officially dedicated on October 14, 1921. The building is named for Ulrik Vilhelm Koren, one of the college's founders and a long-time supporter. From 1969 to 1978 it housed the Spiritual Life Center as well as offices and classrooms. The former reading room was converted into a chapel. The building now houses classrooms and offices for the social sciences, the Anthropology Lab, and the Anthropology Collections. The two to three story brick building was designed in the Neoclassical style by the Minneapolis architectural firm of Magney & Tusler. It was individually listed on the National Register of Historic Places in 1984. In 2021, the building was included as a contributing property in the Luther College Campus Historic District.
