= Cleveland International Film Festival =

Annual film festival held in Cleveland, USA

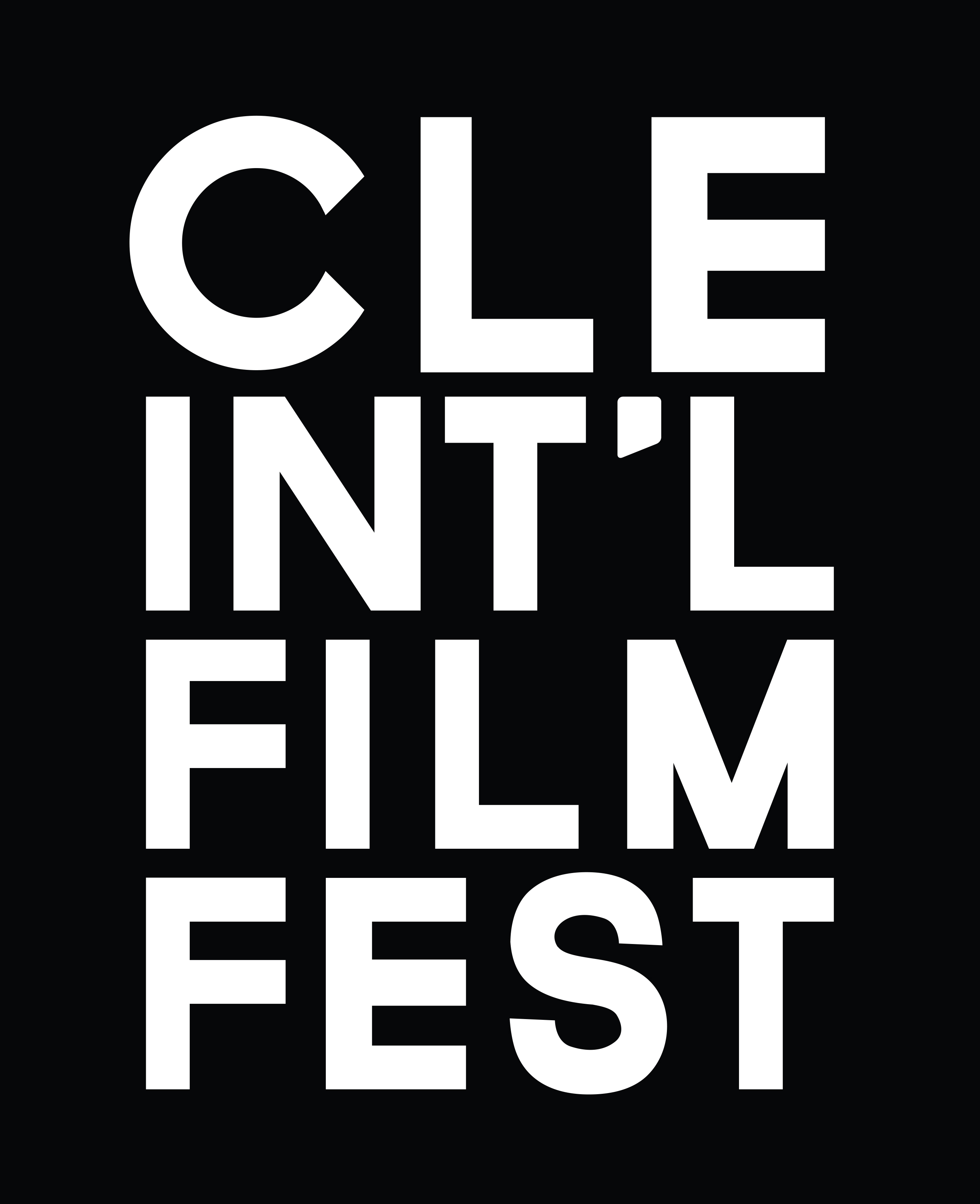
- Venue: Playhouse Square
- Locations: Cleveland, Ohio, U.S.
- Inaugurated: April 13, 1977
- Founder: Jonathan Forman
- People: Paul Sloop
- Website: clevelandfilm.org

The Cleveland International Film Festival (CIFF) is an annual film festival based in Cleveland, Ohio. Inaugurated in 1977, it's the largest film festival in Ohio and among the longest-running in the United States. The festival is held at Playhouse Square, the largest performing arts center in the United States outside of New York City.

In 2023, MovieMaker named it one of the "25 Coolest Film Festivals in the World". CIFF is also an Academy Award-qualifying festival for short films.

== History ==
The CIFF had its inaugural festival in 1977 with seven feature films over eight weeks at the Cedar Lee Theatre in Cleveland Heights. In 1991, the festival relocated to Tower City Cinemas in Downtown Cleveland. At points during its nearly five-decade run, the festival has also put on additional programming and events at other local venues, including the Akron Art Museum, the Akron-Summit County Public Library, the Apollo Theatre in Oberlin, the Capitol Theatre on Cleveland's west side, and Shaker Cinemas on Shaker Square.

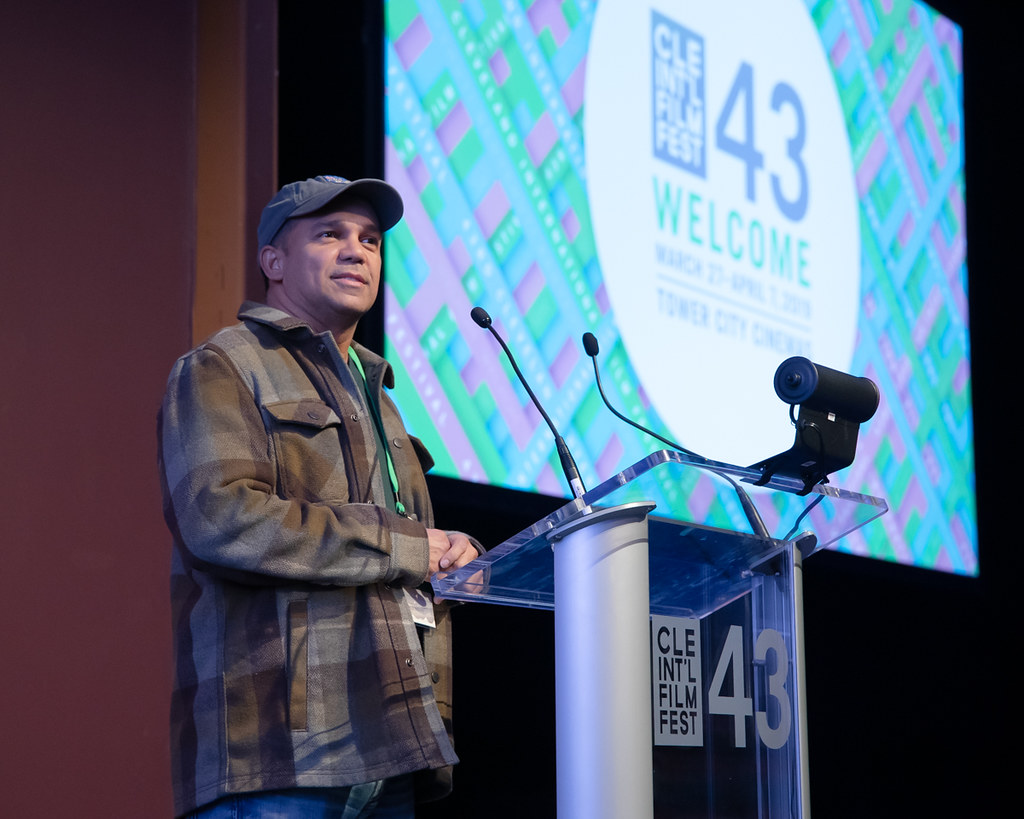
Film director Flavio Alves at the 2019 festival

After 30 years at Tower City Cinemas, CIFF announced that it would move to Playhouse Square ahead of the 2021 festival. Due to the global COVID-19 pandemic, the 44th festival, its last at Tower City Cinemas, was canceled. The festival moved to a digital streaming platform for the first time in its history over two weeks at the end of April 2020. For the 45th festival, with the pandemic continuing through 2020 into 2021, the festival opted to continue with a digital festival dubbed CIFF45 Streams. 2022 was the festival's first time at Playhouse Square during CIFF46.

Recently, the festival has focused on films that dwell on social issues, including feminism, environmentalism, Jewish and Israeli issues, and LGBT issues. The festival also has a focus on family-friendly films and films from Central and Eastern Europe.

From 2022-24, average in-person attendance was 32,799. CIFF estimated that they hosted about 30,000 viewers in 2025, the average, from 2017-19, was 105,999. The organizations endowment has shrunk from $3 million to $1 million.

Throughout its history, CIFF has experienced tremendous growth in submissions. Its 49th festival in 2025 was curated from over 3,500 submissions from 60 countries.

== Awards ==
The Cleveland International Film Festival offers multiple awards and honors to its films and filmmakers, including for Best Documentary and for Best Central and Eastern European film. In 2006, the festival introduced The Greg Gund Memorial Standing Up Film Competition, which honors films focused on social justice and activism and is sponsored by The George Gund Foundation in honor of Greg Gund, who died in a plane crash in 2005. Another major award is the Roxanne T. Mueller Audience Choice Award for Best Film, which has been awarded annually since 1988 and is named in honor of the late Roxanne Mueller, who was a film advocate and film critic for The Plain Dealer.

=== Roxanne T. Mueller Audience Choice Award ===
- 2026
  - Jane Elliott Against the World - Best Documentary Feature
  - A Simple Machine - Best Narrative Feature
- 2025 - Come See Me in the Good Light
- 2024 - American Delivery
- 2023 - 1946: The Mistranslation That Shifted Culture
- 2022 - From the Hood to the Holler
- 2021 - Not Going Quietly
- 2019 - Princess of the Row
- 2018 - The Drummer and the Keeper
- 2017 - Big Sonia
- 2016 - Romeo Is Bleeding
- 2015 - Becoming Bulletproof
- 2014 - Matt Shepard is a Friend of Mine
- 2013 - Good Ol' Freda
- 2012 - Under African Skies
- 2011 - Vincent Wants to Sea
- 2010 - Louder Than a Bomb
- 2009 - Cherry Blossoms
- 2008 - One Bad Cat: The Reverend Albert Wagner Story
- 2007 - Darius Goes West
- 2006 - Live and Become
- 2005 - Mad Hot Ballroom
- 2004 - Born Into Brothels
- 2003 - Spellbound
- 2002 - Autumn Spring
- 2001 - Big Eden
- 2000 - The Butterfly
- 1999 - Return with Honor
- 1998 - Character
- 1997 - Shall We Dance?
- 1996 - Fiddlefest
- 1995 - The Sum of Us
- 1994 - Backbeat
- 1993 - Into the West
- 1992 - Enchanted April
- 1991 - Cross My Heart
- 1990 - Cinema Paradiso
- 1989 - The Beast
- 1988 - The Grand Highway

== Notes ==
An earlier film festival by the same name, the Cleveland Film Festival, was first held in 1948 and ran through 1956. That festival awarded winning 16 mm films of all types with "Oscars" and set off a trend that dominated the sponsored film category for over 20 years.
