= Pat Sikes =

- Citizenship: British
- Occupation: professor
- Spouse: David

Academic work
- Discipline: Qualitative Research
- Institutions: University of Sheffield

Pat Sikes is a British professor emeritus of Qualitative Inquiry from the University of Sheffield. She wrote Researching Sex and Lies in the Classroom (2009) and Parents Who Teach (1997), edited Researching Race and Social Justice in Education (1997), and co-wrote Successful Writing for Qualitative Researchers (1999).

== Personal life ==
Sikes is married to her former teacher David, with whom she had two children. Having lived with dementia since the age of 55, David died in 2020 at the age of 72.
