= The Eye of the Storm (1970 film) =

- Directed by: William Peters
- Starring: Jane Elliott
- Narrated by: Bill Beutel
- Country of origin: United States
- Original language: English

Production
- Running time: 25 minutes
- Production company: ABC News

Original release
- Network: American Broadcasting Company (ABC)
- Release: 1970

The Eye of the Storm is a 1970 American television documentary featuring schoolteacher Jane Elliott conducting her "Blue Eyes/Brown Eyes" exercise in discrimination, in her third-grade classroom at Riceville Elementary School in Riceville, Iowa. Riceville, a small town near the Minnesota border, is almost entirely white; in that context, young children had little understanding of the concept of discrimination. The documentary is narrated by Bill Beutel and directed by William Peters, who developed the idea with his spouse and associate producer, Muriel Peters.

== Premise ==
William Peters follows Jane Elliott's schoolroom exercise, conducted over two consecutive days, during which an otherwise homogeneous group of elementary school kids was divided by their eye color. On the first day, members of one group were favored and thus received deferential, even preferential, treatment all day. Meanwhile, the members of the other group were disfavored; their treatment was a reflection of that. On the second day, the roles were reversed.

== Follow-up ==
This documentary was followed up with "A Class Divided", a 1985 Frontline episode in which The Eye of the Storm is shown to the original participating students—as adults 15 years later—and Elliott is given a chance to find out how much of the lesson her students retained.
