= Nordic Choir =

Choir in Iowa, United States

- Origin: Decorah, Iowa
- Founded: 1948 (78 years ago)
- Founder: Sigvart Steen
- Members: 68
- Director: Timothy Peter (interim)
- Concert hall: Center for Faith and Life, Luther College, Decorah, Iowa

The Luther College Nordic Choir is an a cappella SATB choir based at Luther College in Decorah, Iowa.

== History ==
The Luther College Nordic Choir was established by Sigvart Steen, an alumnus of the college, in 1946. Just two years after its founding, Weston Noble began a 57-year tenure as the choir's music director and conductor. During this time, Noble continued to cultivate the Lutheran collegiate choral traditions in the United States.

Additional choirs were created in order to accommodate the growing interest in choral music and voice at Luther College. Following Noble's retirement in 2005, Craig Arnold became the Director of Choral Activities and conductor of the Nordic Choir. Arnold held this position until 2010, when he was succeeded by Allen Hightower, who led the ensemble until 2016. Andrew Last, Luther College graduate and former student-President of the Nordic Choir was named the fifth conductor of the choir in 2017, stepping down in 2026. Timothy Peter was named interim director following Lat's resignation. Peter formerly directed Luther College's Norsemen (now Norskkor) and Cathedral Choirs from 1991 to 2006.

== Tours ==
The Nordic Choir tours annually throughout the United States and has appeared at many of the major concert halls and music centers in the United States, including Lincoln Center, New York City; the Kennedy Center, Washington, D.C.; Orchestra Hall, Chicago; Orchestra Hall and the Historic State Theater, Minneapolis; the Ordway Music Theater, St. Paul, Minnesota; Walt Disney Concert Hall, Dorothy Chandler Pavilion and the Crystal Cathedral, Los Angeles; and the historic Mormon Tabernacle, Salt Lake City. The choir also has been featured in three international television broadcasts of the Hour of Power and on four national convention programs of the American Choral Directors Association.

Every third year the choir tours internationally. The Nordic Choir has made numerous concert tours of Europe, the Caribbean, Mexico, Russia, and Eastern Europe. During its 1994 tour of Russia and Eastern Europe, the Nordic Choir performed in Tchaikovsky Hall, Moscow, and the Franz Liszt Academy of Music, Budapest, and shared a concert in Saint Petersburg's Philharmonic Hall with the Saint Petersburg Conservatory Choir. The Nordic Choir returned to Russia and Eastern Europe in 1997 on a tour that included performances with the Moscow Chamber Orchestra. In 2000 and 2003, the choir honored the college's roots with tours to Norway and Scandinavia. In 2006, the Nordic Choir toured Europe with concerts in Italy, Austria, Germany and the Czech Republic, including performances at St. Peter's Basilica and St. Thomas Church, Leipzig. In May and June 2009, the Nordic Choir returned to Europe with concerts in Italy, France, and Spain, and in May 2012, the choir toured the British Isles. In 2015, the choir toured Italy, and in 2018 returned to Germany to see the sites of the college's namesake Martin Luther. The choir planned to travel to South Africa in 2021, but the tour was cancelled to due the COVID-19 pandemic. Most recently in 2024, as a celebration of the 200 year anniversary of Norwegian immigration to the United States, the choir took their international touring schedule back to Norway. The choir plans to return to Norway in 2027 to strengthen connections there.

Closer to home, the choir appears frequently on campus in concerts, worship services and at "Christmas at Luther", the college's annual, nationally-televised and Emmy Award winning Christmas concert series, alongside the Luther College Symphony Orchestra and five other Luther choirs.

In the fall of 2006, the Nordic Choir released its first CD under the direction of Craig Arnold, The Road Home, that joined the extensive library of recordings highlighting the Noble choral legacy. The choir's album Prayer, under the direction of Allen Hightower, was released in 2014.

== Notable members ==
- Jonathan D. Campbell
- Weston Noble
