= Jane Elliott Against the World =

2026 American documentary film

- Directed by: Judd Ehrlich
- Produced by: Judd Ehrlich; Max Powers; Elena Gaby
- Release date: January 27, 2026 (Sundance)
- Running time: 90 minutes
- Country: United States
- Language: English

Jane Elliott Against the World is a 2026 American documentary film directed and produced by Judd Ehrlich, with producers Max Powers and Elena Gaby. It premiered at the 2026 Sundance Film Festival.

== Premise ==
A rural Iowa schoolteacher, Jane Elliott, becomes a national voice against racism after leading a controversial 1968 lesson in discrimination with her all-white third-grade class, and continues speaking out as she approaches age 90 amid contemporary debates about race, history, and power.

== Release ==
Jane Elliott Against the World made its world premiere at the 2026 Sundance Film Festival, which ran from January 22 to February 1, 2026, with the at-home program available online from January 29 to February 1, 2026.
