= Regents Center =

Arena at Luther College in Decorah, Iowa

Coordinates: 43°18′49.91″N 91°48′27.63″W

- Interactive map of Regents Center
- Former names: The Fieldhouse (1964–1991)
- Location: Luther College; Decorah, Iowa 52101
- Owner: Luther College
- Operator: Luther College
- Capacity: 2,600

Construction
- Opened: 1964

Tenant
- Luther College Norse (IIAC) (1964-present)

Regents Center is an arena located on the campus of Luther College in Decorah, Iowa. The arena is home to the Luther College Norse men's basketball, women's basketball, volleyball and wrestling teams. During inclement weather, Luther's commencement ceremonies are held in the arena.

== History ==
The arena was completed in 1964 as a replacement for the C.K. Preus Gymnasium, which was destroyed by fire in 1961. The arena was originally known as The Fieldhouse. In addition to athletics, the arena was the home of Luther's music ensemble concerts until the completion of the Center for Faith and Life in 1978. Through 2001, Luther's performance of Handel's Messiah was held in the arena.

An addition featuring new facilities for indoor track and other sports was completed in 1991, when the building was renamed the Regents Center. Another addition, the Legends Fitness for Life Center, was completed in 2001.
