= Weston Noble =

Weston Noble

Weston H. Noble (November 30, 1922 – December 21, 2016) was an American music educator and conductor.

The Ervin and Phyllis Johnson Professor of Music Emeritus at Luther College since 2005, he was best known for his 57-year tenure on the faculty as conductor of the Nordic Choir from 1948 to 2005 and the Luther College Concert Band from 1948 to 1973. He served as guest director for over 800 music festivals in all three media, choral, orchestral and wind, spanning four continents.

Following retirement from Luther in 2005, he engaged in a series of guest professorships at sister Lutheran colleges in the Midwest: artist-in-residence at Carthage College in Kenosha, Wisconsin, where he taught in the music department and conducted the Carthage Choir; visiting professor and interim conductor of the Wartburg Choir at Wartburg College in Waverly, Iowa; and guest conductor of the Augustana Choir at Augustana College in Sioux Falls, South Dakota.

== Biography ==
=== Early life and education ===
Weston Henry Noble was born and raised on a farm located just west of Riceville, Iowa to parents of English ancestry. Later, he was confirmed in the Free Methodist Church and received his early education in a country one-room schoolhouse until the eighth grade, afterward attending the local Riceville High School. Like many young Iowans with an interest in music at that time, Noble played in the high school band, sang in the choir, and played clarinet solos at state music contest. He first demonstrated his talents when taking piano lessons at the urging of his paternal aunt, Ruby (Noble) Dunton, and came to master the clarinet, organ, and piano as well.

Graduating from high school at the age of 16, his original intention was to enroll at The University of Iowa, then the largest and most prominent institution of higher learning in the state. Through the influence of his father, Merwin Henry Noble, Weston enrolled instead at nearby Luther College in Decorah in 1939. Majoring in history with studies in music (not yet a major at the college), he quickly drew the attention of the music faculty due to his demonstrated talents in conducting, which were sparked, according to Noble, by the last minute request of Schola Cantorum director Theodore Hoelty-Nickel to lead a rehearsal of the choir in his absence. In his second year, he began leading rehearsals for the ensemble. He completed his student teaching at the local Decorah High School.

=== Military career ===
Due largely to the intense patriotism of World War II and anticipating eventual conscription, Noble volunteered for military service and was called to active duty in February 1943, in the spring semester of his senior year. Nevertheless, arrangements were made for him and others to accelerate their studies and complete their final semester prior to commencement. He graduated magna cum laude. Trained as a tank driver, he saw action in the Battle of the Bulge in 1944 and was part of the main Allied thrust into the heart of Nazi Germany in 1945. Noble "liberated" some items from Berlin during the initial stages of the Allied occupation which he mailed home. After arriving home and teaching high school for a year in Iowa, Noble's father sent him a letter notifying him that he had a large package to pick up. The package contained a marble bust of Beethoven possibly previously owned by Reichsmarschall Hermann Göring. It was somehow acquired by an acquaintance of Noble who attended the Nuremberg Trials. Today the sculpture is being analyzed to find out who made it and when it was made.

=== Teaching ===
Discharged from military service, Noble returned to Iowa in 1946 and took a position as a high school teacher in Lu Verne, where he directed the school's music program and taught courses in the social sciences. After a two-year stint, he began graduate studies in music at the University of Michigan. In 1948, his alma mater, Luther College, sought him out to fill a one-year faculty appointment as interim director of the band and choir. His appointment was extended to two years, and then became more permanent beginning in 1950. During a highly distinguished 57-year career, Noble served as music director of the Luther College Concert Band from 1948–1973 and the Nordic Choir from 1948-2005.

Following his retirement, Noble served a one-year appointment as visiting conductor-in-residence at Carthage College in Kenosha, Wisconsin during the 2007-08 academic year. During 2008-09, Mr. Noble conducted the Wartburg Choir and Ritterchor at a nearby sister institution, Wartburg College, in Waverly, Iowa.

== Musical activities ==
Noble was an internationally acclaimed conductor as well as a music educator. His distinguished career included conducting more than 900 music festivals throughout the United States, Australia, Canada, Europe, Russia, Asia, and South America. The venues included Lincoln Center and Carnegie Hall in New York, the Kennedy Center in Washington, D.C., the Los Angeles Music Center, Chicago Orchestra Hall, the Ordway Theater in St. Paul, Orchestra Hall in Minneapolis, and the Bolshoi, Kremlin and Tchaikovsky Halls in Moscow. He is the only director to have led all-state choruses, bands and orchestras in all fifty states.

In 2006, Noble was guest director of a choir partly made up of Nordic Choir alumni. This choir had a two-week concert tour of Europe in which they held a residence at the Salzburg Festival. From that tour was formed the Weston Noble Alumni Choir, a 70-voice choir that meets on the campus of Luther College every summer for a week of rehearsals and a performance. The Alumni Choir returned to Europe in 2010 for a two-week concert tour and in the summer of 2012 completed a one-week tour of California.

In the spring of 2006, he conducted the Mormon Tabernacle Choir in a national radio broadcast. He also received the Distinguished Service Award from The Church of Jesus Christ of Latter-day Saints, making him the only non-Mormon to ever receive this award. In June 2006, he was once again the guest conductor at Guam's 3rd Annual Pacific Summer Music Festival. Most recently he guest conducted the JMU ACDA Choral Fest.

In December 2010, at the age of 88 years, Noble traveled to South Korea for the first time, conducting a concert of Handel's "Messiah" for the Camarata Music Company. Noble died in December 2016 at the age of 94 of complications from a fall.

== Legacy ==
Noble built the 72-voice Nordic Choir into one of the most elite a cappella college choirs in the United States. His Nordic Choir has performed throughout the United States and, indeed, much of the world. He served as guest conductor at more than 900 music festivals around the world.

== Awards ==
- Robert Lawson Shaw Citation, awarded by the American Choral Directors Association
- Distinguished Service Award, 2006 - received from The Church of Jesus Christ of Latter-day Saints, and the only non-Mormon to be so honored
- St. Olav's Medal, 1999 - received from King Harald V of Norway for his contributions to Norwegian-American relations
- Weston H. Noble Award for Lifetime Achievement in the Choral Art, 1998 - first recipient of this award, presented to him by Robert Shaw on behalf of the American Choral Directors Association
- Outstanding Music Educator of the United States, 1989 - presented to him by the National Federation of State High School Associations
- Honorary doctorate degrees
  - Augustana College (South Dakota), 1971
  - St. Olaf College, 1996
  - Westminster Choir College, 2005
  - Carthage College, 2008
  - Wartburg College, 2009
