= Critic's Choice =

Critic's Choice, Critics' Choice, or Critics Choice may refer to:

- Critics Choice Association
  - Critics' Choice Awards
  - Critics' Choice Super Awards
- Critic's Choice (Brit Award)
- Critics' Choice (album), a 1958 album by Pepper Adams
- Critic's Choice (play), a 1960 Broadway play by Ira Levin
- Critic's Choice (film), a 1963 film directed by Don Weis starring Bob Hope and Lucille Ball and based on the stage play
- Critic's Choice: Top 200 Albums, a 1978 music reference book compiled by Paul Gambaccini
