= William Peters (journalist) =

American journalist

William Ernest Peters Jr. (July 30, 1921 – May 20, 2007) was an American journalist and documentary filmmaker who frequently covered race relations in the United States. His 1956 Redbook magazine article "Our Weapon Is Love" introduced the Rev. Martin Luther King Jr. and the philosophy of nonviolent resistance to the nation.

== Biography ==
Born in San Francisco, he earned a bachelor's degree in English from Northwestern University in 1947. He served as an Army Air Force pilot during World War II.

Peters won Peabody Awards for his 1963 CBS Reports documentary Storm Over the Supreme Court, his 1967 documentary Africa, 1970's Eye of the Storm, and 1976 Suddenly an Eagle. His 1985 documentary A Class Divided, a sequel to Eye of the Storm, aired on PBS Frontline and won an Emmy Award. He also wrote several books, including The Southern Temper in 1959 and "For Us the Living", a book about Medgar Evers co-authored with Myrlie Evers (widow of Medgar Evers) in 1967. In 1964, Peters began work on CBS Reports: The Homosexuals with the approval of CBS News head Fred W. Friendly, although the program was not completed and aired until 1967.

Peters lived in Louisville, Colorado, late in life and died there of Alzheimer's disease. His daughter Gretchen Peters is an American singer and songwriter.
