= The Price of Freedom (2021 film) =

Documentary film

The Price of Freedom is a 2021 American documentary film by Judd Ehrlich about the National Rifle Association of America.

== Summary ==
It traces back to the history of the NRA and their powerful influence fueled by the narrative of fear.

=== Interviews ===
- Bill Clinton
- David Keene
- Lucy McBath
- Fred Guttenberg
- X Gonzalez

== Reception ==
On Rotten Tomatoes the film has a 100% based on reviews from 7 critics. On Metacritic it has a score of 77% based on reviews from 4 critics.

Owen Gleiberman of Variety called it "An absorbing, disturbing, and scrupulously well-researched documentary that lays out the nuts and bolts of the National Rifle Association's history." Gary Goldstein of the Los Angeles Times wrote: "Clear-eyed, compassionate and compelling, the documentary "The Price of Freedom" efficiently unpacks and debunks the myths it posits the National Rifle Assn. of America has deployed to further its all-guns-all-the-time agenda and foster a culture war."

== See also ==
- Bowling for Columbine
- Gun violence
