= J. W. Ylvisaker =

Former President of Luther College

Johannes Wilhelm Ylvisaker was the fifth President of Luther College in Decorah, Iowa.

== Early life ==
J. W. Ylvisaker was born on April 18, 1900, to Johannes Ylvisaker in Robbinsdale, Minnesota. He attended Luther College in Decorah, Iowa, graduating in 1921. Ylvisaker then studied at Luther Theological Seminary, and graduated from Princeton Theological Seminary in 1926 with a Master of Theology degree.

After graduating, Ylvisaker served as pastor in Northwood, Iowa, and at Our Saviour's Lutheran Church in Minneapolis, Minnesota.

== President of Luther College ==
In 1948, Ylvisaker was elected as the fifth president of Luther College in Decorah, Iowa. Under Ylvisaker's presidency, Luther College grew. Several building projects were undertaken, including Brandt Hall, the rebuilding of Main, Olson Hall, Valders Hall of Science, and the Dahl Centennial Union. Enrollment continued to grow, peaking at 1,357 students in 1961, compared to 910 in 1948 when Ylvisaker assumed the presidency. Ylvisaker also oversaw the transition from the 10-member Board of Trustees to the 21-member Board of Regents in 1958, and the centennial celebrations of the college in 1961. During Ylvisaker's final year, shortly after the homecoming celebrations, Preus Gymnasium burned. It was a devastating blow to the college, since the gymnasium and its classrooms were the home of several departments on campus. Ylvisaker retired at the end of the 1961-1962 academic year.

During his presidency, Ylvisaker also served as president of the Association of Iowa College Presidents, president of the Iowa College Foundation 1953-55, and president of the National Lutheran Educational Conference in 1959.

== Personal life ==
Ylvisaker married Lucille Torgerson in 1930. They had two children. Ylvisaker died in 1981.

== Legacy ==
In 1964, a new residence hall was built, named Ylvisaker Hall in honor of J. W. Ylvisaker.
