= Riceville, Iowa =

- City
- Location of Riceville, Iowa
- Coordinates: 43°21′43″N 92°33′14″W
- Country: United States
- State: Iowa
- Counties: Mitchell, Howard

Area
  - Total: 1.07 sq mi (2.76 km^{2})
  - Land: 1.06 sq mi (2.74 km^{2})
  - Water: 0.0077 sq mi (0.02 km^{2})
- Elevation: 1,230 ft (370 m)

Population (2020)
  - Total: 806
  - Density: 761.1/sq mi (293.86/km^{2})
- Time zone: UTC-6 (Central (CST))
  - Summer (DST): UTC-5 (CDT)
- ZIP code: 50466
- Area code: 641
- FIPS code: 19-66585
- GNIS feature ID: 2396360
- Website: riceville.govoffice2.com

Riceville is a city in Howard and Mitchell counties in the U.S. state of Iowa. The population was 806 at the time of the 2020 census.

== History ==
Riceville was platted in 1855 by three of the Rice brothers, Leonard, Dennis, and Gilbert. Riceville was incorporated as a town in 1892.

== Geography ==
According to the United States Census Bureau, the city has a total area of 1.11 square miles (2.87 km^{2}), of which 1.10 square miles (2.85 km^{2}) is land and 0.01 square miles (0.03 km^{2}) is water.

== Demographics ==
Historical populations
Year	Pop.	±%
1900	804	—
1910	844	+5.0%
1920	960	+13.7%
1930	807	−15.9%
1940	910	+12.8%
1950	942	+3.5%
1960	898	−4.7%
1970	877	−2.3%
1980	919	+4.8%
1990	827	−10.0%
2000	740	−10.5%
2010	785	+6.1%
2020	806	+2.7%
Source:"U.S. Census website". United States Census Bureau. and Iowa Data Center; Source: U.S. Decennial Census

=== 2020 census ===
As of the census of 2020, there were 806 people, 351 households, and 195 families residing in the city. The population density was 761.1 inhabitants per square mile (293.9/km^{2}). There were 385 housing units at an average density of 363.6 per square mile (140.4/km^{2}). The racial makeup of the city was 92.3% White, 0.0% Black or African American, 0.5% Native American, 0.5% Asian, 0.0% Pacific Islander, 3.8% from other races and 2.9% from two or more races. Hispanic or Latino persons of any race comprised 5.0% of the population.

Of the 351 households, 24.2% of which had children under the age of 18 living with them, 41.6% were married couples living together, 8.3% were cohabitating couples, 28.5% had a female householder with no spouse or partner present and 21.7% had a male householder with no spouse or partner present. 44.4% of all households were non-families. 38.7% of all households were made up of individuals, 20.5% had someone living alone who was 65 years old or older.

The median age in the city was 42.8 years. 24.3% of the residents were under the age of 20; 3.8% were between the ages of 20 and 24; 24.9% were from 25 and 44; 22.2% were from 45 and 64; and 24.7% were 65 years of age or older. The gender makeup of the city was 49.9% male and 50.1% female.

=== 2010 census ===
As of the census of 2010, there were 785 people, 298 households, and 166 families living in the city. The population density was 713.6 inhabitants per square mile (275.5/km^{2}). There were 379 housing units at an average density of 353.6 per square mile (136.5/km^{2}). The racial makeup of the city was 97.7% White, 0.1% Native American, 0.8% from other races, and 1.4% from two or more races. Hispanic or Latino of any race were 2.2% of the population.

There were 341 households, of which 25.2% had children under the age of 18 living with them, 48.4% were married couples living together, 8.8% had a female householder with no husband present, 4.1% had a male householder with no wife present, and 38.7% were non-families. 36.7% of all households were made up of individuals, and 18.5% had someone living alone who was 65 years of age or older. The average household size was 2.22 and the average family size was 2.84.

The median age in the city was 45.7 years. 21.9% of residents were under the age of 18; 7.3% were between the ages of 18 and 24; 19.3% were from 25 to 44; 25.8% were from 45 to 64; and 25.6% were 65 years of age or older. The gender makeup of the city was 47.9% male and 52.1% female.

=== 2000 census ===
As of the census of 2000, there were 840 people, 369 households, and 225 families living in the city. The population density was 765.8 inhabitants per square mile (295.7/km^{2}). There were 401 housing units at an average density of 365.6 per square mile (141.2/km^{2}). The racial makeup of the city was 99.88% White, and 0.12% from two or more races.

There were 325 households, out of which 23.3% had children under the age of 18 living with them, 50.7% were married couples living together, 6.8% had a female householder with no husband present, and 39.0% were non-families. 35.5% of all households were made up of individuals, and 21.1% had someone living alone who was 65 years of age or older. The average household size was 2.18 and the average family size was 2.80.

In the city, the population was spread out, with 21.8% under the age of 18, 7.1% from 18 to 24, 21.1% from 25 to 44, 21.5% from 45 to 64, and 28.5% who were 65 years of age or older. The median age was 45 years. For every 100 females, there were 90.0 males. For every 100 females age 18 and over, there were 80.5 males.

The median income for a household in the city was $30,982, and the median income for a family was $41,786. Males had a median income of $29,091 versus $19,904 for females. The per capita income for the city was $20,661. About 4.7% of families and 4.1% of the population were below the poverty line, including 1.8% of those under age 18 and 8.0% of those age 65 or over.

== Economy ==
Link Energy, a family owned and operated farm, uses a 2 M gallon methane digester to generate 600KW of electricity. The digester runs on manure, waste egg products, and meat packing and meat locker waste. It also makes biogas, dairy cattle bedding and biosolids for fertilizer.

== Notable people ==
- One of the most famous natives of Riceville is Jane Elliott, an elementary school teacher who developed a famous and controversial exercise about the nature of prejudice and racism in the wake of the assassination of Martin Luther King Jr.
- Riceville is also the home of the first siblings to rise through the career ranks of the United States Foreign Service to become ambassadors: John and Larry Dinger.
- Ray Conger was an Olympic athlete, born and raised in Riceville. He held the world record for the 1,000 yards and American record for the 1,500 meters, and competed in the 1928 Olympic Games in Amsterdam.
