= Luther College (Iowa) =

Lutheran college in Decorah, Iowa, US

- Motto: Soli Deo Gloria
- Motto in English: To God alone be the Glory
- Type: Private college
- Established: 1861; 165 years ago
- Religious affiliation: Evangelical Lutheran Church in America
- Academic affiliations: Associated Colleges of the Midwest
- Endowment: $220.2 million (2025)
- President: Bradley Chamberlain
- Provost: Pamela Bacon
- Undergraduates: 1,384
- Location: Decorah, Iowa, U.S. 43.316°N 91.803°W
- Campus: 175 acres (71 ha) main campus, an additional 825 acres (334 ha) of field research areas
- Colors: Blue & white
- Nickname: Norse
- Sporting affiliations: NCAA Division III – MWC
- Website: luther.edu
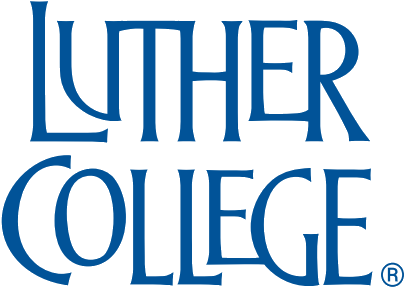
- Luther College Campus Historic District
- U.S. National Register of Historic Places
- U.S. Historic district
- Area: approximately 61 acres (25 ha)
- NRHP reference No.: 100006184
- Added to NRHP: March 5, 2021

Luther College is a private Lutheran liberal arts college in Decorah, Iowa, United States. Established as a Lutheran seminary in 1861 by Norwegian immigrants, the school is an institution of the Evangelical Lutheran Church in America. The upper campus was listed as the Luther College Campus Historic District on the National Register of Historic Places in 2021.

== History ==
On October 10, 1857, the Norwegian Evangelical Lutheran Church (NELC) created a seminary to supply ministers for Norwegian congregations in the Upper Midwest. Until the seminary was established in 1861, students studied at Concordia Seminary in St. Louis, Missouri. On October 14, 1859, Peter Laurentius Larsen was appointed professor to the Norwegian students at Concordia by the NELC.

Upon the closing of the seminary in April 1861, at the start of the Civil War, the NELC decided to open its own college that fall in a former parsonage at Halfway Creek, Wisconsin, just north of La Crosse, Wisconsin, and close to present-day Holmen, Wisconsin. On September 1, 1861, classes officially began with an enrollment of 16. The following year classes moved to Decorah, Iowa, with NELC pastor Ulrik Vilhelm Koren successfully arranging the college's relocation and permanent settlement.

In 1866, a group of students signed a "bill of rights" criticizing the rigid schedule, the rules about going downtown, the lack of windows in some of the sleeping rooms, and the woodcutting and shoe-shining chores, concluding that "there was not enough freedom." The leader of the group, 18-year-old Rasmus B. Anderson, was expelled. This event was viewed as a rebellion and "the worst of sins" by the pastors assembled in a pastoral conference shortly after.

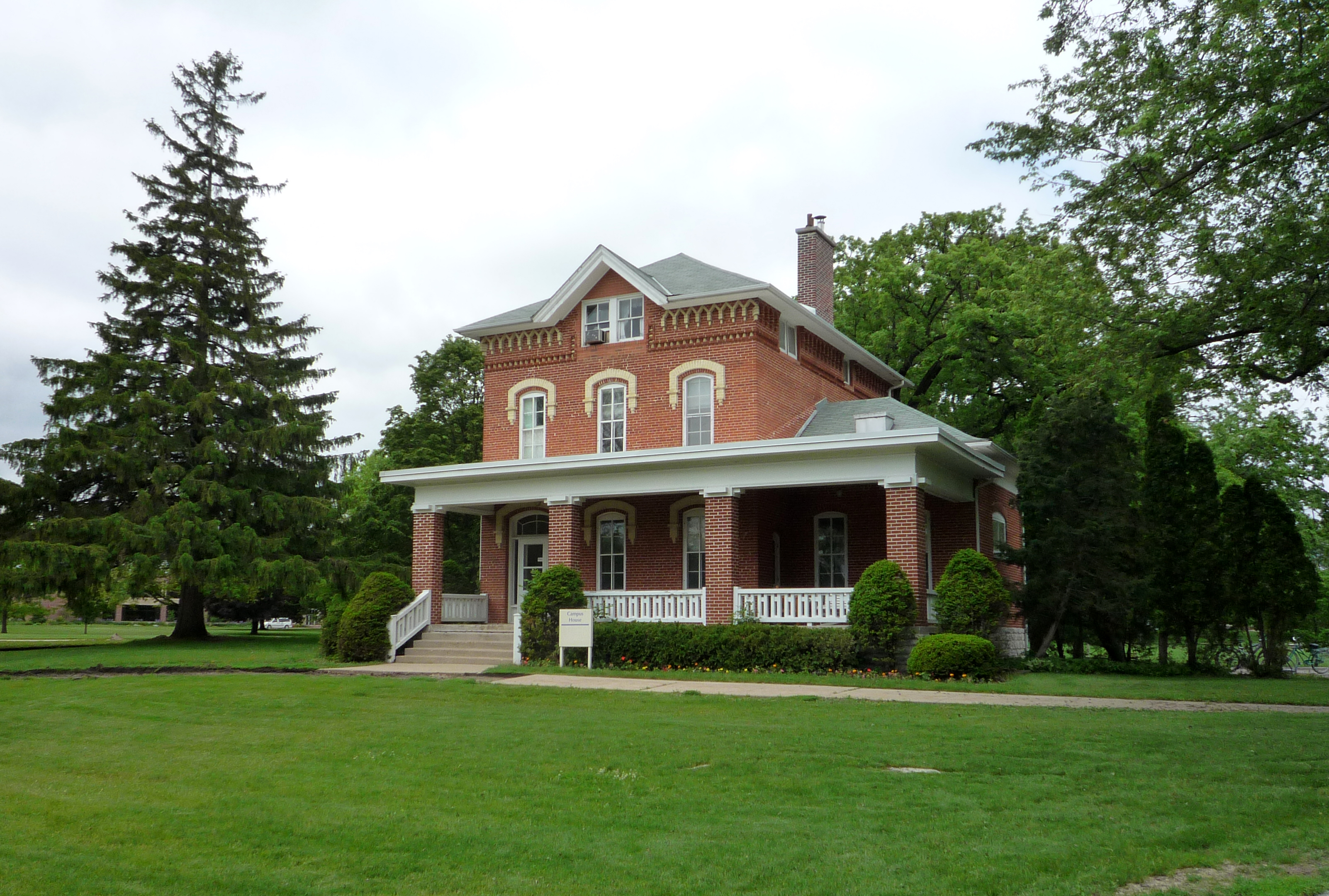
Campus House, built in 1867, is the oldest building on campus. Originally a parsonage for Nils O. Brandt (1824–1921), pastor of the campus, it was soon purchased by the college

In 1905, Carlo A. Sperati, an 1888 graduate of Luther, became the music director of the college and developed the Luther College Concert Band, founded in 1878, on the model of the wind ensemble pioneered by John Philip Sousa. Under Sperati, the band undertook several tours of Europe, their first in 1914, earning international acclaim for their musical talent. Sperati remained on the faculty until his death in 1945.

In 1932, Luther College administrators dropped the mandatory study of the classics and embraced the modern concept of the liberal arts education. Due to financial constraints associated with the Great Depression, the college's leaders decided to admit women as students in 1936. During the 1960s, several new campus buildings were constructed and college administrators adopted a 4-1-4 semester schedule (two 4-month semesters with a 1-month session between them).

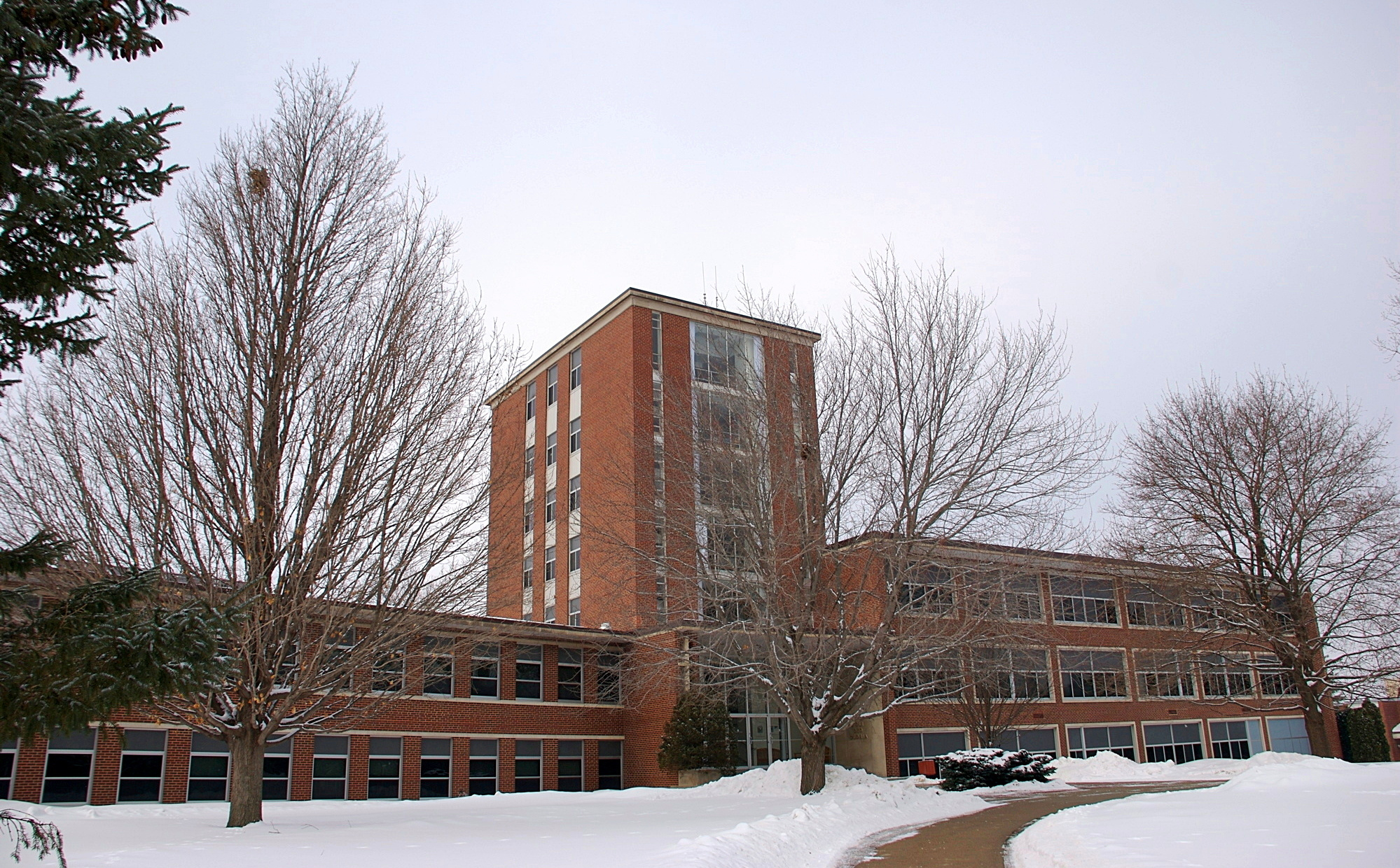
Luther's current Main Building is the third to stand in the same location; fire destroyed the previous two.

In 1964, Luther's museum collection became separate from the college and was established as the Norwegian-American Museum. Now known as Vesterheim Norwegian-American Museum, it is the largest and most comprehensive museum in the United States devoted to a single immigrant group. Nordic Fest, started in 1967, grew from Luther College Women's Club's annual celebration of Norwegian Constitution Day.

== Campus ==
Luther lies at the edge of Decorah, a small town situated in the hilly driftless region of the Upper Midwest. The Upper Iowa River flows through the lower portion of the nearly 200-acre (81 ha) central campus. The college owns an adjoining 800 acres (320 ha) devoted to environmental research, biological studies, and recreation.

Luther student housing includes residence halls (Miller Hall, Dieseth Hall, Ylvisaker Hall, Farwell Hall, Brandt Hall, Larsen Hall, and Olson Hall) and several houses, townhouses, and apartment buildings. Ninety-five percent of Luther students live on campus all four years. Farwell, an upperclassmen dorm consisting of both double and single rooms housing 259 students, opened in 1991. Designed by Hammel, Green, & Abramson Inc., the building has nine stories costing approximately $7,000,000.

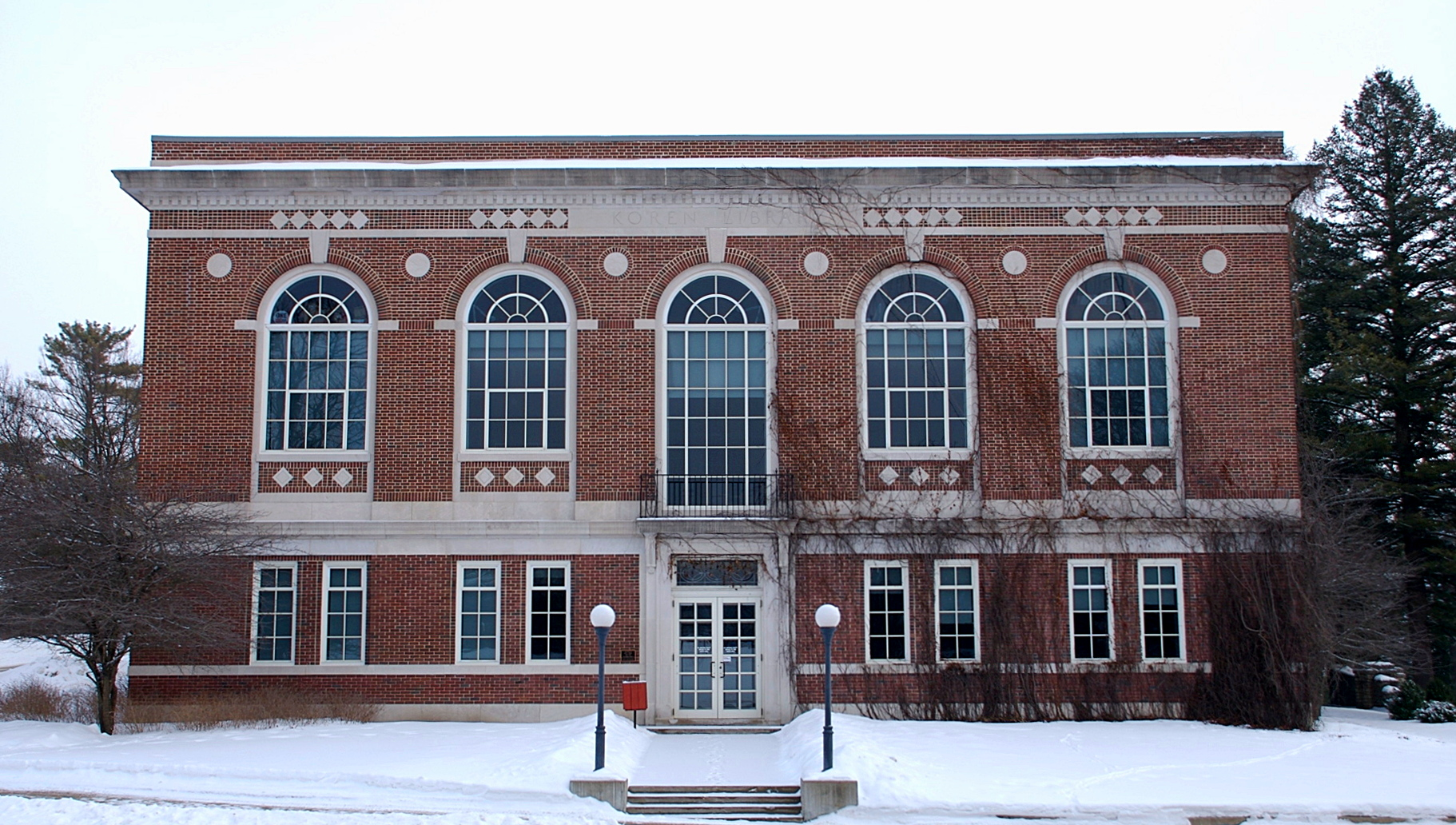
Koren building, one of the oldest on campus, houses Luther's social sciences departments.

In the 2000s, the college engaged in extensive building projects. A renovation of residence halls and the Dahl Centennial Union was completed in 2006, and Sampson Hoffland Laboratories, an extension of Valders Hall of Science, was completed in 2008.

The Center for Faith and Life is Luther's largest and primary performing arts facility. Other performance areas on campus include the Center for the Arts and Jenson-Noble Hall of Music.

In 2021, the historic upper campus was listed as a historic district on the National Register of Historic Places. At the time of its nomination it consisted of 33 resources, which included 17 contributing buildings, four contributing objects, seven non-contributing buildings, and five non-contributing objects. One of the contributing buildings, Koren Hall, was individually listed on the National Register in 1984.

== Academics ==
Luther is an exclusively undergraduate institution, enrolling 1,744 students as of fall 2021 and employing 177 full-time faculty in 2015–2016. The college is accredited by the Higher Learning Commission. It is a member institution of the Associated Colleges of the Midwest and the Annapolis Group.

Among private liberal arts colleges, Luther was ranked 102nd by the 2021 edition of U.S. News & World Report's college and university rankings.

Tuition and fees are shown as $61,500 for 2023–2024, with 98 percent of students receiving need- and/or merit-based financial aid.

Its most popular majors, by 2021 graduates, were:

1. Nursing (39)
2. Management (31)
3. Biology (29)
4. Psychology (27)
5. Music (19)
6. Social Work (18)
7. Political Science (17)

== Music ==
Luther has a number of music organizations that tour and sell recordings internationally. The Nordic Choir, Concert Band, Symphony Orchestra and Jazz Orchestra are the college's four internationally touring ensembles, which have performed in many of the major concert halls and music centers of Europe, as well as Russia, China, Japan, Mexico, Brazil, and the Caribbean. About 40 percent of the students participate in at least one of the college's five choirs, two concert bands, two string orchestras, and two jazz ensembles. "Christmas at Luther," Luther's annual Christmas concert, is broadcast nationwide each year. The concert broadcast is updated annually.

Much of Luther's musical heritage can be attributed to the influence of two long-serving individuals. The 40-year tenure of Carlo A. Sperati, Class of 1888, fostered the college's Lutheran musical tradition beginning in 1905 and developed the Luther College Concert Band into one of the first nationally touring music ensembles. Sperati's Concert Band achieved national acclaim, and famed bandmaster John Philip Sousa canceled a performance of his own touring ensemble so that he could attend a performance of the Luther College Concert Band, which was scheduled to appear in a nearby city.

Sperati's foundation was built upon by Weston Noble, Class of 1943, himself a student of Sperati. Following three years of U.S. Army enlistment in World War II, Noble returned to his alma mater to conduct the Concert Band and the Nordic Choir, direct Christmastime performances of George Frederic Handel's Messiah, and teach in the Music Department. Noble's bands (which he conducted until 1973) and choirs completed coast-to-coast tours and international appearances. Ensembles under his direction performed solo concerts at such venues as Lincoln Center and Town Hall in New York; the Kennedy Center in Washington, DC; the Mormon Tabernacle in Salt Lake City; Dorothy Chandler Pavilion and the Walt Disney Concert Hall in Los Angeles; Orchestra Hall at Symphony Center in Chicago; Orchestra Hall and the State Theatre in Minneapolis; and the Ordway Center for the Performing Arts in Saint Paul. Under Noble's direction, Luther ensembles also appeared at historic cathedrals and concert halls throughout Europe, Russia, and Scandinavia, as well as on the programs of many national conventions of the American Bandmasters Association, the American Choral Directors Association, and the Music Educators National Conference.

The Nordic Choir was featured in the film The Joy of Bach, and in four weekly international broadcasts of The Hour of Power from the Crystal Cathedral in Garden Grove, California. Weston Noble retired from the faculty at the close of the academic year in 2005, having served continuously for 57 years, from 1948 to 2005. A new film documentary To This Day about the first international tour of the Nordic Choir in 1967 was released in October 2017.

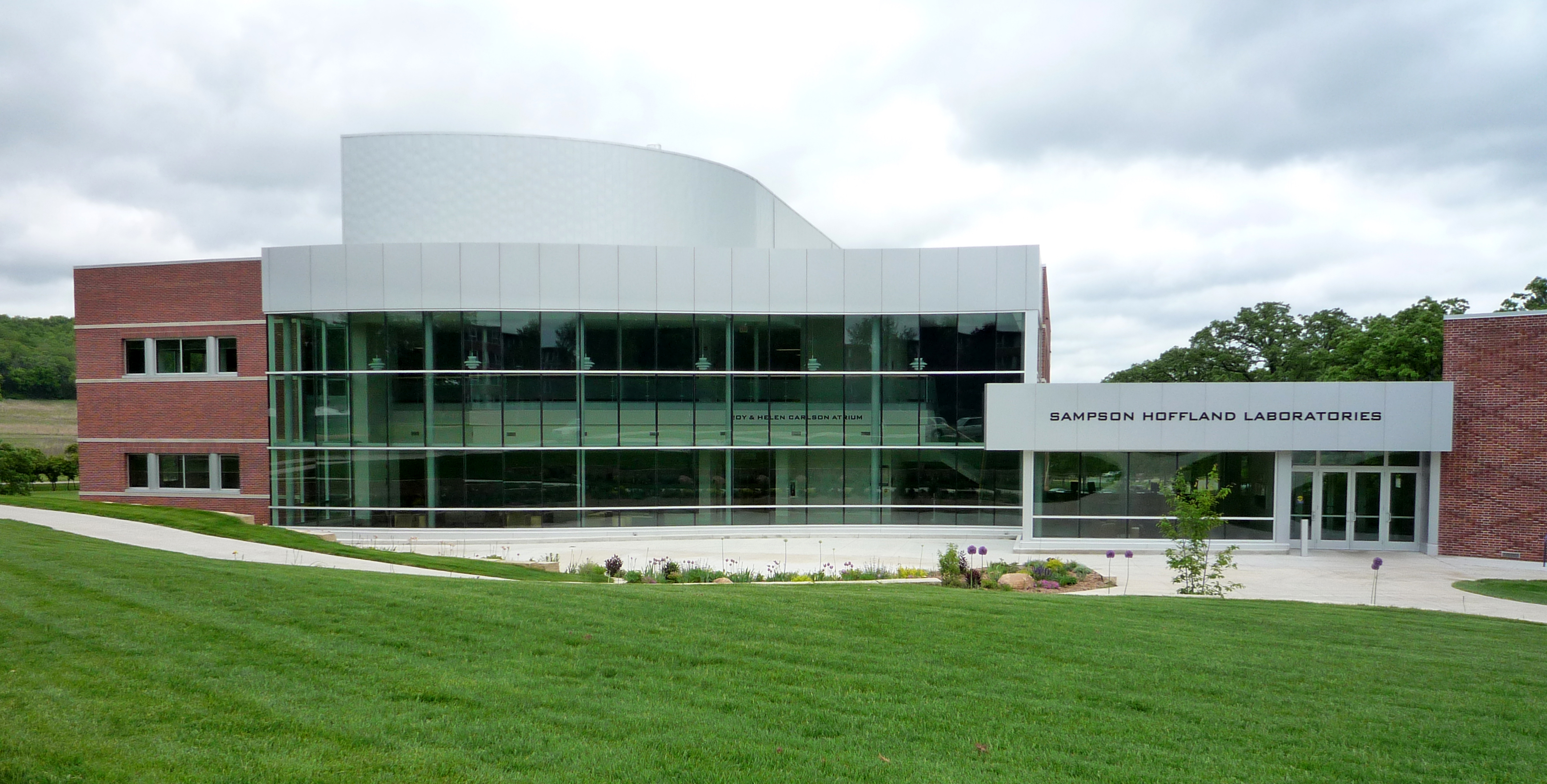
The 64,000-square-foot (5,900 m^{2}) Sampson Hoffland Laboratories expanded Valders Hall of Science.

The Nordic Choir, which tours internationally, is one of the five choral ensembles at Luther. Collegiate Chorale is a SATB choir composed of upperclassmen and Cathedral Choir is a SATB choir composed of sophomores only. Aurora and Norskkor, featuring soprano-alto and tenor-bass voices, respectively, are composed entirely of first-year students. In addition to the five choirs, students have opportunities with Collegium Musicum and Vocal Jazz Ensemble. Collegium Musicum is an early music ensemble specializing in the music of the medieval, Renaissance, and baroque periods. The ensemble focuses more on instrumental works but incorporates vocal music throughout the academic year. The ensemble is open to singers of all years at Luther. The Vocal Jazz Ensemble is open to all students and often performs jointly with Luther's instrumental jazz ensembles.

Symphony Orchestra, Jazz Orchestra, and Concert Band also tour internationally. Symphony Orchestra establishes residency in Vienna every four years, and Jazz Orchestra has toured in the Caribbean and Brazil. Concert Band travels internationally every five years and have visited countries such as Spain, Iceland, Norway, and more. Other instrumental ensembles include Chamber Orchestra, Philharmonia, Jazz Band, Symphonic Band, Brass Ensemble, among others.

Luther students also participate in faculty-coached student chamber ensembles ranging from piano trios to a full flute choir. Some of these ensembles include the Luther Ringers student handbell choir; the 40+ member Trombone Choir; five student-led, small-group a cappella ensembles; the Luther College Balalaika ensemble; and the student-led Luther Gospel Choir.

In 1996, musician Dave Matthews appeared in concert with Tim Reynolds at Luther College in the Center for Faith and Life, which resulted in their 1999 album Dave Matthews and Tim Reynolds Live at Luther College. The album was a massive success, reaching No. 2 on the Billboard 200.

In 2002, the Empire Brass, with college organist William Kuhlman, appeared in concert and recorded an album, Baroque Music for Brass and Organ, in the Center for Faith and Life. In 2008, musician Ben Folds appeared for his second time in concert at the Center for Faith and Life.

== Study abroad ==
Each year, between 400 and 500 Luther students participate in international study, ranking Luther among the top baccalaureate colleges in the nation for the percentage of students who study abroad prior to graduation—over two-thirds. Over the years, more than 150 Luther faculty have led Luther students on programs in more than 70 countries.

== Athletics ==
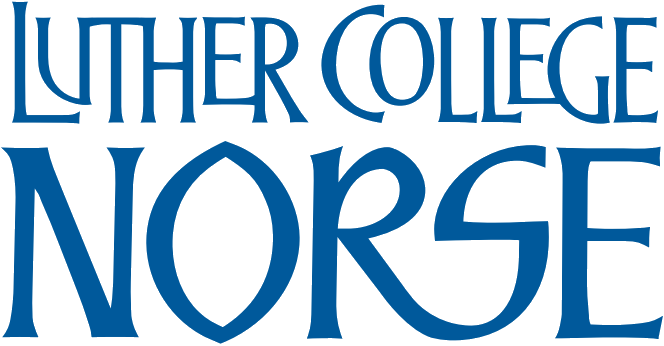
Luthor College athletics wordmark

The Luther Norse were members of the American Rivers Conference (formerly Iowa Intercollegiate Athletic Conference) from the conference's founding in 1922 until moving to the Midwest Conference in 2026. Luther competes in 11 men's and 10 women's intercollegiate athletic programs. During its time in the Iowa Conference, Luther has won 237 IIAC/A-R-C titles.

Three hundred thirty-eight All-American honors have been earned by Luther student-athletes, and twenty-nine athletes have been crowned national champions. Sixty-eight student-athletes have been awarded the CoSIDA Academic All-American honor, and forty-two have received the distinguished NCAA Postgraduate Scholarship.

Since 1993–1994, the first year of the award, 1,929 academic all-conference honors have been earned by Luther student-athletes. To earn academic all-conference honors, a student-athlete must have a grade point average of 3.50 or greater on a 4.0 scale, have attended the school for a full year, and have competed in a varsity sport.

Approximately 25 percent of Luther students participate in one of the 21 varsity sports offered. A large majority of the study body participates in intramural activities which vary by semester and is offered by the Recreational Services program. Outdoor Recreational Services is an extension of the Recreational Services program in which students/staff lead outdoor activities such as slacklining, kayak trips on the Upper Iowa River, fall break trips, rock climbing, and whitewater rafting.

=== Varsity sports ===
Men's sports	Women's sports
Baseball	Basketball
Basketball	Bowling
Bowling	Cross country
Cross country	Golf
Football	Soccer
Golf	Softball
Soccer	Swimming and diving
Swimming and diving	Tennis
Tennis	Track and field
Track and field	Volleyball
Wrestling	Wrestling

=== Club sports ===
Men's sports	Women's sports
Rugby	
Volleyball	
Co-ed sports
Ultimate Frisbee
Nordic Ski

=== Outdoor facilities ===
Carlson Stadium: 5,000 seats; blue turf football field; eight-lane, 400-meter polyurethane track with two-directional approaches for pole vault and all jumping events; two shot put circles; discus/hammer cage; and multi-directional javelin-throwing areas.

Other outdoor facilities include 12 tennis courts, baseball and softball diamonds with enclosed dugouts, lighted soccer field, cross-country running course, intramural rugby, soccer, and ultimate frisbee pitches, fitness trail, ropes course, and room for cross country skiing.

=== Indoor facilities ===
The Regents Center Main Gymnasium: three full-sized basketball courts and seating capacity for 2,600. Used for practice and playing of volleyball and men's and women's basketball, and as the competition site venue for wrestling. Norse basketball teams also have access to full-sized cedar basketball court in the north gym and two basketball courts in the Sports and Recreation Center.

Sports and Recreation Center: newly renovated in 2022.

Legends Fitness Center: 10,000-square-foot (930 m^{2}) training center.

The Aquatic Center features a 25-yard, eight-lane pool with separate one-meter and three-meter diving well and a shallow area for swimming lessons, adaptive physical education classes, and water aerobics.

== Notable alumni ==
- Torger Juve, 1866 – Wisconsin State Legislature
- Herbjørn Gausta, 1872 – American artist best known for his landscape paintings
- Ole Grönsberg, 1877 – second president of Pacific Lutheran University
- Ludvig Hektoen, 1883 – pathologist
- Ingebrikt Grose, 1885 – first president of Concordia College
- Laurits S. Swenson, B.A. 1886, M.A. 1889 – United States ambassador to Denmark, Switzerland, Norway, and the Netherlands
- Ole J. Kvale, 1890 – U.S. representative from Minnesota
- Jacob Aall Ottesen Preus, 1903 – 20th Governor of Minnesota
- Norman Brunsdale, 1913 V 24th Governor of North Dakota and U.S. senator from North Dakota
- V. Trygve Jordahl, 1922 V Luther College Board of Regents, district president and director of Evangelical Lutheran Church
- Marv Olson, c. 1928 – Major League baseball player
- Robert E. A. Lee, 1942 – head of the Lutheran Church's film production operations
- Adolph Herseth, 1943 – principal trumpet of the Chicago Symphony Orchestra
- Robert Preus, 1944 – Lutheran theologian and president of Concordia Theological Seminary, Fort Wayne, Indiana
- Howard A. Knutson, 1951 – Minnesota lawyer and Minnesota State Representative
- Ole Ivar Lovaas, 1951 – Norwegian-American clinical psychologist and professor at the University of California, Los Angeles
- Brad Steiger, 1957 – writer and paranormal researcher
- Phyllis Yes, 1963 – artist
- Dave Senjem, 1964 – Minnesota State Senator; minority leader; majority leader
- John Lehman, 1967 – Wisconsin State Senator
- Dean Johnson, 1969 – Minnesota Senate majority leader (DFL), brigadier general, chief of National Guard Chaplains
- Bruce Tammen, 1971 – artistic director and conductor of Chicago Chorale, recipient of Weston Noble Choral Award for outstanding service in vocal music education
- Cheryl Browne, 1972 – Miss Iowa 1970, first African-American contestant in the Miss America pageant
- Gregory R. Dahlberg, 1973 – United States Under-Secretary of the Army; Senior vice president Lockheed Martin
- Donovan W. Frank, 1973 – federal judge for the United States District Court for the District of Minnesota
- Michael Osterholm, 1975 – professor and director of the Center for Infectious Disease Research and Policy
- Brian Rude, 1977 – Wisconsin State Assembly
- Dagfinn Høybråten, 1979 – secretary general, Nordic Council of Ministers; board chair of the GAVI Alliance
- Brian Andreas, 1979 – writer, painter, sculptor, publisher; Luther College Distinguished Service Award recipient
- Arne Sorenson, 1980 – president and chief executive officer of Marriott International
- Jim Nussle, 1983 – U.S. Congressman from Iowa; director of the Office of Management and Budget for President George W. Bush
- Callista Gingrich – United States ambassador to the Holy See and United States ambassador to Switzerland and Liechtenstein
- Drew Curtis, 1995 – founder and administrator of Fark
- Aaron Sheehan, 1998 – Grammy award-winning tenor
- Josh Cinnamo, 2003 – Tokyo 2020 & Paris 2024 Paralympian, World Champion, World Record Holder

== Notable faculty ==
- Marcia Bunge, Lutheran theologian
- Herbjørn Gausta, artist
- Gerhard Forde, Lutheran theologian
- A. Thomas Kraabel, classics scholar
- Weston Noble, music educator
- Dean Schwarz, artist specializing in ceramics
- Henry O. Talle, Congressman from Iowa's 4th congressional district
- Oscar Tingelstad, president of Pacific Lutheran College

== See also ==
- Center for Faith and Life
- List of presidents of Luther College
