= Andy Baker (national security advisor) =

American government official (born 1980)

- Baker in 2025

United States Deputy National Security Advisor
- Incumbent
- Assumed office May 23, 2025
- President: Donald Trump
- Preceded by: Alex Nelson Wong

National Security Advisor to the Vice President
- In office January 20, 2025 – May 23, 2025
- Vice President: JD Vance
- Preceded by: Philip H. Gordon
- Succeeded by: Cliff Sims

Personal details
- Born: Andrew Collison Baker; May 22, 1980 (age 46) Sonoma, California, U.S.
- Education: University of California, Berkeley (BA); University of Oxford (MPhil, DPhil)

Andrew Collison Baker (born May 22, 1980) is an American national security advisor who has served as the United States deputy national security advisor alongside Robert Gabriel Jr. and Michael Needham since May 2025. Baker has served as the national security advisor to the vice president alongside Cliff Sims since January 2025.

Baker graduated from the University of California, Berkeley with a bachelor's degree in history, and later from the University of Oxford with a Master of Philosophy and a Doctor of Philosophy in international relations in 2007. He joined the Department of State as a Foreign Service officer in 2010. Ohio senator JD Vance named Baker as his national security advisor in 2023. As Vance's national security advisor, Baker dissuaded Vance from supporting military assistance to Ukraine.

Following the 2024 presidential election, in which Vance was elected vice president, Baker assisted Robert Wilkie in transition efforts selecting staff at the Department of Defense. In January 2025, Vance named Baker as his national security advisor. He was involved in broad peace negotiations to end the Russo-Ukrainian war, including the Ukraine–United States Mineral Resources Agreement, the United States attacks in Yemen, and the United States's response to the India–Pakistan conflict.

== Early life and education ==
Andrew Collison Baker was born on May 22, 1980, in Sonoma, California. Baker was raised in San Francisco. He earned a bachelor's degree in history from the University of California, Berkeley. Baker later studied international relations at the University of Oxford, earning a Master of Philosophy and a Doctor of Philosophy in international relations in 2007. He spent five years as an academic lecturer. Baker's dissertation focused on the liberal international order.

== Career ==
=== Department of State (2010–2023) ===
In 2010, Baker joined the Department of State as a Foreign Service officer. He worked in Afghanistan and the NATO headquarters in Brussels. Baker is proficient in Russian, Bulgarian, and Persian.

=== National security advisor to JD Vance (2023-2025) ===
In 2023, Ohio senator JD Vance named Baker as his national security advisor. As Vance's national security advisor, Baker dissuaded Vance from supporting military assistance to Ukraine. According to European Pravda, in a meeting of pro-Ukrainian constituents of Vance, Baker espoused pro-Russian talking points, blamed the Russian invasion of Ukraine on NATO expansion, and refused to fault Russia for its actions.

=== National security advisor to the vice president (January–May 2025) ===
Following the 2024 presidential election, Baker assisted Robert Wilkie in transition efforts selecting staff at the Department of Defense. Politico Magazine described his role as "central." In January 2025, Baker was named as Vance's national security advisor. He helped draft Vance's confrontational speech at the 61st Munich Security Conference, and was involved in broad peace negotiations to end the Russo-Ukrainian war, including the Ukraine–United States Mineral Resources Agreement.

== Deputy national security advisor (2025–present) ==
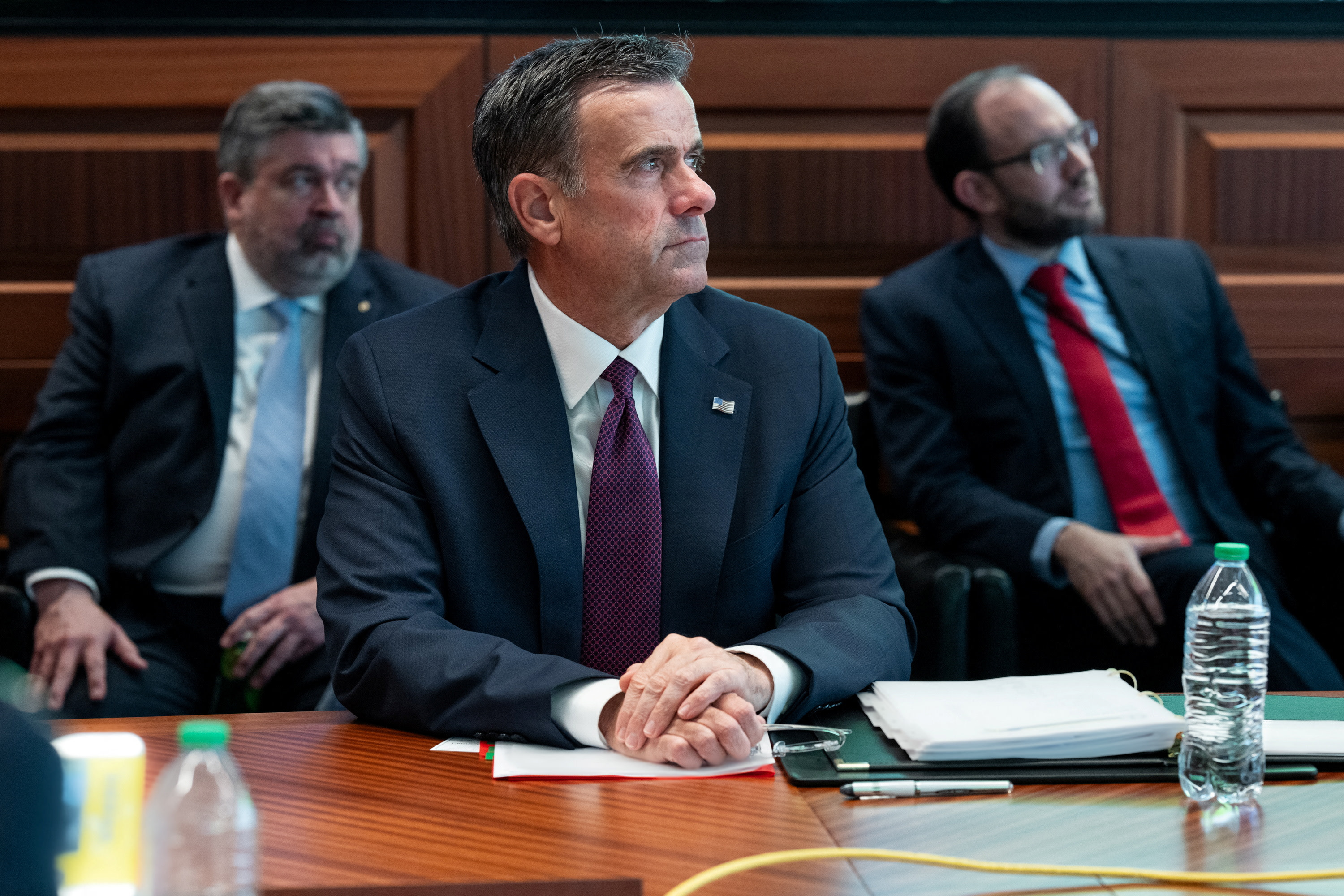
Baker (right) observing the United States strikes on Iranian nuclear sites

In May 2025, Axios reported that Marco Rubio, the acting national security advisor, had named Baker the deputy national security advisor alongside Robert Gabriel Jr. as part of a restructuring effort. Alexander Gray, the chief of staff to the National Security Council in Trump's first term, described Baker as a "foreign policy intellectual" and Gabriel as a "practical operator." Baker was among several officials who observed the United States strikes on Iranian nuclear sites. He was involved in planning the United States attacks in Yemen, the United States's response to the India–Pakistan conflict, and the composition of the Trump administration's National Security Strategy.

In August 2026, Axios reported that Baker was set to leave his position as the deputy national security advisor.

== Views ==
In his doctoral dissertation, Baker argued that the liberal international order depended on "certain shared social commitments" on sovereignty and use of force. His arguments were later espoused by JD Vance in his speech before the Munich Security Conference, which associated the weakening of security agreements between the United States and Europe with Europe's apparent censorship of conservative policies.

In his tenure as a Foreign Service officer, Baker developed the view that the foreign policy of the United States was being improperly applied abroad and harmed working-class Americans domestically. According to Politico, he is opposed to unnecessary foreign policy engagements by the United States, and that he sought a resolution to the Russo-Ukrainian war without being anti-Ukraine. A European official told Politico that Baker "seems to overestimate Russia's strength and influence."

== Books ==
In 2011, Baker published Constructing a Post-war Order: The Rise of US Hegemony and the Origins of the Cold War, a book based on his doctoral dissertation.
