= Daleep Singh =

American economist (born 1976)

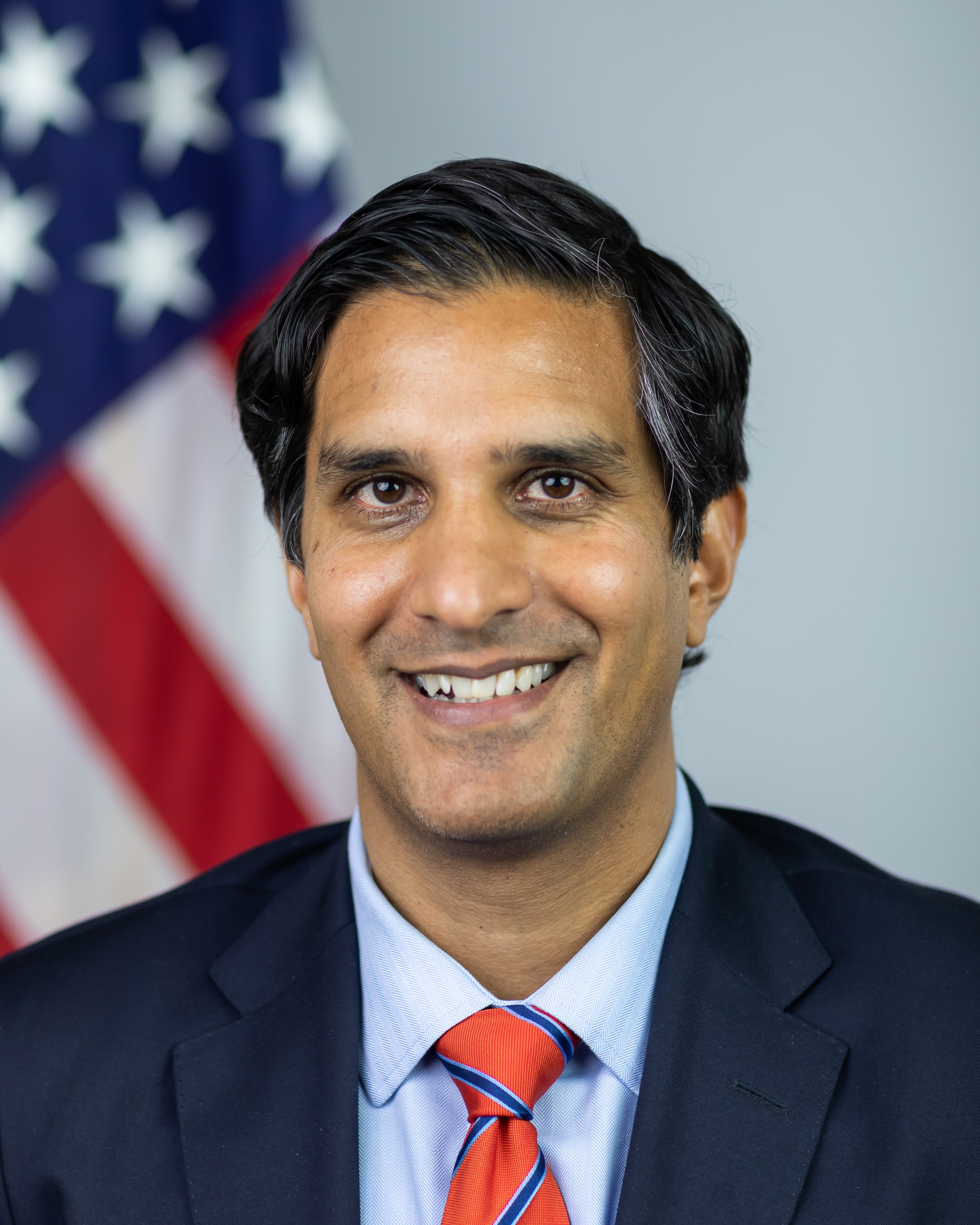
- Official portrait, 2021

United States Deputy National Security Advisor for International Economics
- In office March 2024 – January 20, 2025
- President: Joe Biden
- Leader: Jake Sullivan
- Preceded by: Mike Pyle
- In office February 1, 2021 – June 2022
- President: Joe Biden
- Leader: Jake Sullivan
- Preceded by: Wally Adeyemo (2016)
- Succeeded by: Mike Pyle

Assistant Secretary of the Treasury for Financial Markets
- Acting
- In office February 1, 2016 – January 20, 2017
- President: Barack Obama
- Preceded by: Seth Carpenter (Acting)
- Succeeded by: Monique Rollins (Acting)

Personal details
- Born: March 12, 1976 (age 50) Olney, Maryland, U.S.
- Party: Democratic
- Relatives: Dalip Singh Saund (great-granduncle)
- Education: Duke University (BA); Massachusetts Institute of Technology (MBA); Harvard University (MPA)

Daleep Singh (born March 12, 1976) is an American economist, government official, and financier.

Singh was appointed as Deputy National Security Advisor for International Economics in National Security Council of the Biden White House.

Having previously served in the same role in the Biden administration, he joined PGIM in June 2022 as chief global economist before returning to the administration in February 2024. After the Biden Administration, Singh returned to PGIM as its Vice Chairman.

He was one of the primary architects of the sanctions package that the US implemented on Russia after Russia invaded Ukraine in 2022 and has been at the forefront of designing and teaching "economic statecraft" at the intersection of economic policy and national security, including as a lecturer at the Johns Hopkins School of Advanced International Studies.

== Early life and education ==
Singh was born into a Punjabi Indian Sikh family in Olney, Maryland and raised in Raleigh, North Carolina. He attended Enloe High School and was selected in 1992 to represent North Carolina at Boys' Nation, meeting President George H.W. Bush in the Rose Garden. His great-granduncle was the first Asian American elected to Congress, Dalip Singh Saund.

Singh earned a Bachelor of Arts degree in economics and public policy from Duke University, followed by a dual Master of Business Administration and Master of Public Administration in international economics from the Massachusetts Institute of Technology and the Harvard Kennedy School.

== Career ==
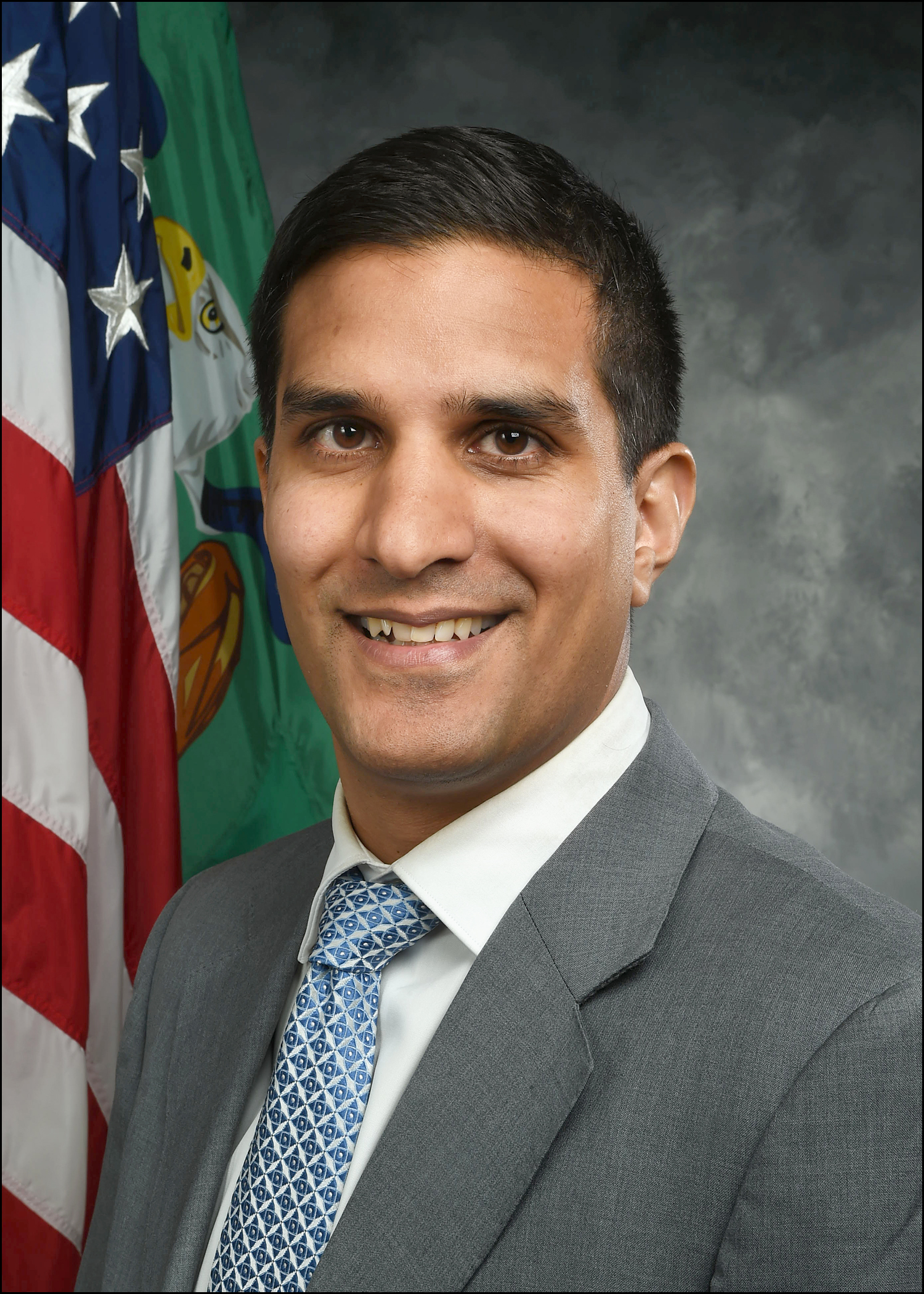
Singh in his capacity as acting Assistant Secretary of the Treasury for Financial Markets

He was also deputy assistant secretary of the Treasury for international affairs and acting Assistant Secretary of the Treasury for Financial Markets in the Obama administration, spearheading the Department's response to Greece's near-exit from the eurozone in 2015 and advocating for reforms to bolster the resilience of Treasury markets.

During the most acute phase of the COVID-19 pandemic in 2020, Singh was executive vice president and head of the Markets Group at the Federal Reserve Bank of New York. In this capacity, Singh was reportedly responsible for implementing most of the emergency lending programs put in place by the Federal Reserve to backstop the economy.

== Biden Administration ==
He was appointed by President Biden as Deputy National Security Advisor at the National Security Council and deputy director of the National Economic Council in mid-February 2021.

Before the invasion of Ukraine, Singh led the Administration’s efforts to launch a competitor to China’s Belt and Road Initiative, craft a digital assets strategy, develop a global pandemic preparedness fund, and reform the World Bank.

=== Russia's invasion of Ukraine ===
After the Russian invasion of Ukraine in late February 2022, Singh emerged as a chief architect of the economic sanctions imposed by the United States on Russia, detailing the Administration's design and strategy in multiple press briefings from the White House podium and press interviews, including a feature story on 60 minutes. Singh identified that the Russian economy was dependent on Western cutting-edge technologies such as microchips and software and that the Russian economy was vulnerable to a sudden stop of overseas capital.

He pushed for and coordinated the sanctions measures taken against Russia's central bank, as the US, EU, UK, Japan, and Canada prohibited any dealings with the entity only two days after the invasion began. According to the New Yorker, "No entity as large as the Russian Central Bank, nor so important to the global economy, had been sanctioned in modern times."

Singh left the White House beginning in May 2022, reportedly due to family reasons, before returning in February 2024 and staying until the end of the Biden Administration.

== 2022–2024 ==
Singh has testified to Congress on the Russia sanctions regime, argued in favor of "freedom bonds"for Ukraine (inspired by the Brady plan), and continued to advocate forcefully in favor of a digital dollar.

In June 2022, he joined PGIM, one of the world's largest global asset managers, as its chief global economist. In December 2022, Singh was named to the Bloomberg 50 list of individuals who most influenced the global business landscape.
