= Henry Luce Scholar =

Postgraduate award to study in Asia

A Luce Scholar is a recipient of a cultural exchange and vocational fellowship sponsored by the Henry Luce Foundation, a private foundation established by Time, Inc. founder Henry R. Luce.

== The program ==
Founded in 1974, the Luce Scholars Program each year provides stipends and professional placements for eighteen young Americans to live and work in Asia. The program's purpose is to increase awareness of Asia among future leaders in American society.

Those who already have significant experience in Asia or Asian studies are not eligible for the Luce Scholars Program. Candidates must be American citizens who have received at least a bachelor's degree and are no more than 30 years old by June 20 of the year they enter the program. Candidates may be nominated by one of 75 colleges and universities.

After interviews with the foundation's staff, finalists meet with one of three selection panels who choose the eighteen Luce Scholars. Placements and support services for the Luce Scholars are provided by the Asia Foundation, an organization with field offices throughout Asia. Placements can be made in many countries in East and Southeast Asia:

== Notable Luce Scholars ==
- Terry B. Adamson (Emory University, 1975), Executive Vice President, National Geographic Society
- Scott Ageloff (Carnegie Mellon University, 1978), Dean, New York School of Interior Design
- Robert Butkin (University of Pennsylvania Law School, 1978), State Treasurer, Oklahoma
- Robert S. Dohner (Harvard University, 1974), Director, East Asia Office, United States Department of the Treasury
- Gary Edson (Stanford University, 1977), Deputy National Security Advisor to President George W. Bush
- Jon Finer (Harvard University), journalist and 33rd United States Principal Deputy National Security Advisor
- Joshua Freedman (Stanford University, 2014), Economic Growth Fellow at the New American Foundation and Forbes contributor on the political economics of higher education
- Paul Gigot, Editor of the Editorial Page, The Wall Street Journal
- David Grogan (Williams College, 1975), Deputy Editor, Discover Magazine
- David Huebner (Princeton, Yale JD), U.S. Ambassador to New Zealand and Samoa
- Justin Hughes (Oberlin College, 1988) William H. Hannon Professor of Law, Loyola Law School
- Camara P. Jones (Wellesley College, 1976) physician and epidemiologist, former President of American Public Health Association, Senior Fellow Morehouse School of Medicine
- John E. Marcom (Princeton, 1979), Senior Vice President, Yahoo
- Jonathan S. Miller (Yale, 1975), General Manager, American Repertory Theatre
- Alan Murray (University of North Carolina Chapel Hill, 1977), former Washington Bureau Chief, CNBC, Executive Editor, the Wall Street Journal, President of Pew Research Center
- Meghan O'Sullivan (Georgetown University, 1991), Senior fellow, Harvard University's John F. Kennedy School of Government</ref> Belfer Center for Science and International Affairs, former White House Deputy National Security Adviser on Iraq and Afghanistan
- Richard Read (Amherst College, 1980), Pulitzer Prize winner, 1999, 2001. Staff writer Los Angeles Times
- Michael L. Riordan (Washington University in St. Louis, 1979), founder and former CEO and chairman, Gilead Sciences
- Nirav D. Shah (University of Chicago JD 2007, MD 2008), director, Maine Center for Disease Control and Prevention
- Lynn Sharp (Smith College, 1976), John G. McLean Professor of Business Administration, Harvard Business School
- Robert Spinner (MIT, Chair of Neurosurgery, Mayo Clinic, Rochester, MN
- Steve Spinner (Wesleyan College, 1991), Adviser to Obama Campaign, Founder Sports Potential
- Robert Zoellick (Swarthmore College, 1975), President, World Bank and former Trade Secretary and Deputy Secretary of State
