= Clinton Bush Haiti Fund =

American non-profit organization

- Founded: January 16, 2010
- Founder: Bill Clinton; George W. Bush
- Location(s): Little Rock, Arkansas (Clinton office); Dallas, Texas (Bush office)
- Region served: Haiti
- Method: Donations and grants
- Website: www.clintonbushhaitifund.org

The Clinton Bush Haiti Fund was a 501(c)(3) nonprofit organization founded on January 16, 2010, by former US presidents Bill Clinton and George W. Bush, to aid the victims of the 2010 Haiti earthquake. The organization was formed in response to the request of President Barack Obama for the former presidents to assist in the Haitian rescue effort. The fund concluded formal operations on December 31, 2012.

The Clinton Bush Haiti Fund's efforts focused primarily on longer-term reconstruction, especially supporting job creation, workforce development, and the promotion of economic opportunity. The fund's stated purpose was to support the restart, expansion and creation of micro, small and medium-sized enterprises, to which women are often key contributors; empower people and enterprises by helping them access the formal business sector; promote job creation (particularly jobs with direct social benefit, such as in health and education); and to provide life skills and job training, especially to youth, so that Haitians can embrace economic opportunity.

== Board of directors ==
On March 5, 2010, a six-member board with two co-chairs, and a CEO, were announced:

- Chief Executive Officer Gary Edson, former Deputy National Security Advisor in President Bush's administration.
- Co-chair Laura Graham, a former Clinton administration official and Chief Operating Officer for the Clinton Foundation.
- Co-chair Joshua Bolten, former White House Chief of Staff to President Bush and currently a visiting professor at Princeton University’s Woodrow Wilson School.
- Bruce Lindsey, a former Clinton administration official and currently Chief Executive Officer of the Clinton Foundation.
- Bill Frist, former US Senate Majority Leader (R-TN) and currently teaching, business and non-profit activities.
- Henrietta Fore, former Administrator of the US Agency for International Development under President Bush and currently chairman and CEO of Holsman International, an investment and management company.
- Alexis Herman, former Secretary of Labor during President Clinton's administration and currently chief executive officer of New Ventures, LLC.

== Donations and grants ==
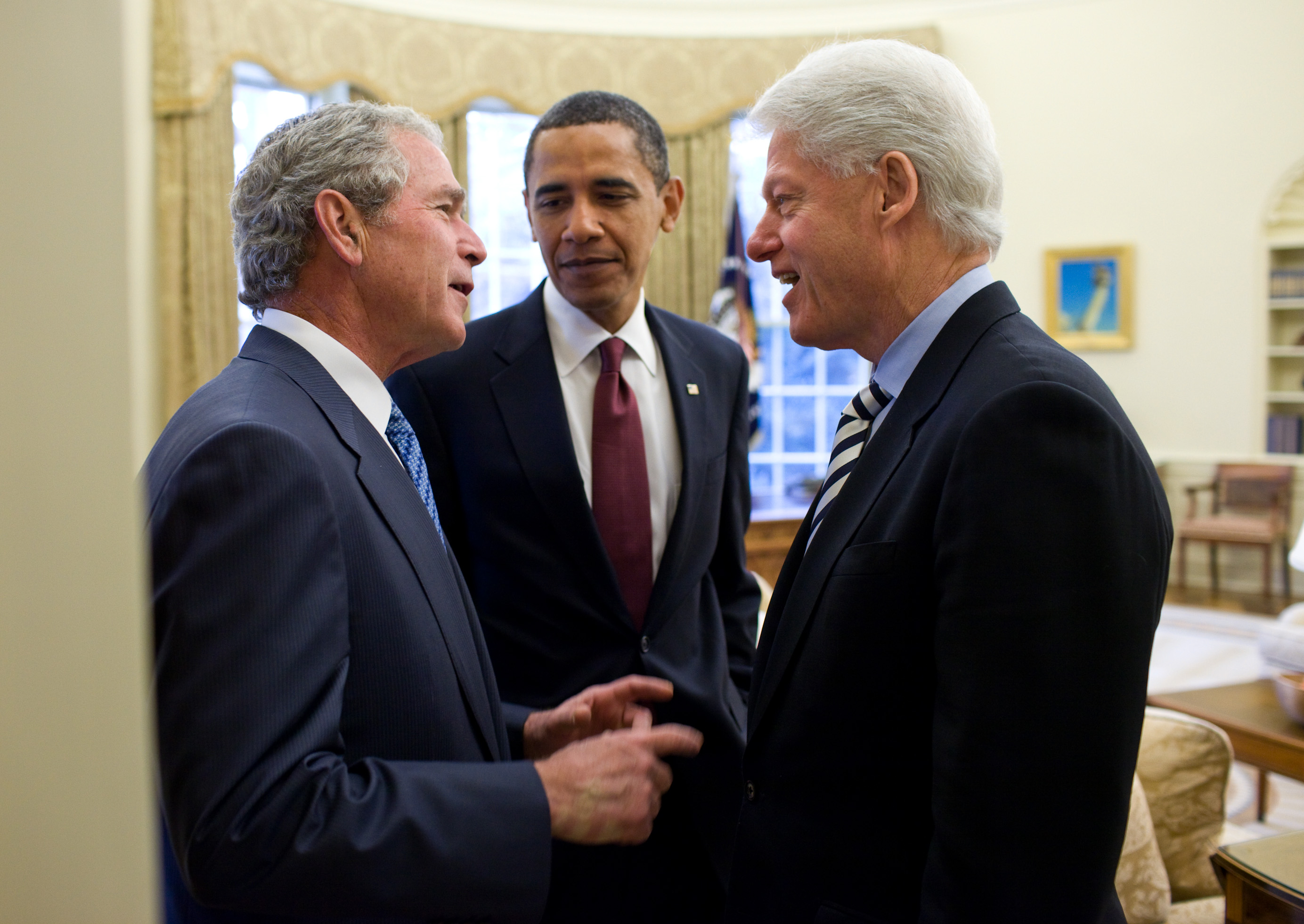
US President Barack Obama discussing the earthquake with former Presidents George W. Bush and Bill Clinton

The Clinton Bush Haiti fund raised $54.4 million from more than 2,000,000 individuals, businesses, and organizations. It dispersed funds to more than 50 organizations through grants, loans, and equity investments. As of December 2012, the Fund estimated that its programs sustained or created 7,350 jobs, trained 20,050 individuals, and had an additional positive impact on the conditions of more than 311,000 Haitians.

Key focus areas for funding included providing small and growing businesses with access to financing, business services, and entrepreneurship training (36%); facilitating job training and workforce development (31%); responding to critical, unmet needs (23%); and supporting the recovery and expansion of microfinance institutions, many of whose beneficiaries are women (10%).

After the Fund ceased formal operations on December 31, 2012, the Multilateral Investment Fund, a member of the Inter-American Development Bank Group, took over management of programs which had not yet been fully completed and began receiving funds from remaining loans. They are charged with reinvesting loan repayments into programs consistent with the Clinton Bush Haiti Fund's mission of promoting economic opportunity in Haiti.
