= Mike Pyle =

Mike or Michael Pyle may refer to:

- Michael Pyle (economist) (born 1977), American investment strategist and economic advisor
- Mike Pyle (American football) (1939–2015), American football player
- Mike Pyle (fighter) (born 1975), American mixed martial arts fighter

== See also ==
- Robert Michael Pyle (born 1947), American lepidopterist and writer
