= Francis M. Bator =

Hungarian-American economist and educator (1925-2018)

Deputy National Security Advisor
- In office October 1965 – September 1967
- President: Lyndon B. Johnson
- Preceded by: Robert Komer
- Succeeded by: Richard V. Allen

Personal details
- Born: August 10, 1925 Budapest, Hungary
- Died: March 15, 2018 (aged 92) Massachusetts, U.S.
- Party: Democratic
- Education: Massachusetts Institute of Technology
- Profession: Professor, economist

Academic background
- Doctoral advisor: Robert Solow

Francis Michel Bator (Hungarian: Bátor Ferenc; August 10, 1925 – March 15, 2018) was a Hungarian-American economist and educator. He was a professor emeritus at Harvard Kennedy School of political economy. He was born in Budapest, Hungary. Bator attended the Massachusetts Institute of Technology and earned a Ph.D. in 1956. He was Deputy National Security Advisor of the United States from 1965 to 1967. He was also a Special Assistant to President Lyndon B. Johnson.

Francis M. Bator was Lucius N. Littauer Professor of Political Economy Emeritus in Harvard's Kennedy School of Government where he was founding chairman of the School's Public Policy Program, and director of studies in its Institute of Politics. Before coming to Harvard in 1967 he served as deputy national security advisor to President Lyndon Johnson covering U.S.-European relations and foreign economic policy. On the occasion of his departure from the White House, The Economist of London headed an article about his service "Europe's Assistant."

Bator's 1958 article "The Anatomy of Market Failure," was recently described as "the standard reference" to the "approach [that] now forms the basis of …textbook expositions in the economics of the public sector." His 1960 book, The Question of Government Spending, was described in the Economic Journal "as a model of the sort of contribution which the economist can make to informed public discussion" and in the NYT as one of seven books that influenced President Kennedy's approach to the presidency.

== Education and career ==
Bator was born in Budapest in 1925. In 1939, he and his family fled to New York, where his father became a banker. Bator was on route to become an Army infantry officer in the Pacific on Victory over Japan Day. Bator obtained a S.B. and Ph.D. both from the Massachusetts Institute of Technology in 1949 and 1956 respectively.

He served as Senior Economic Advisor in the USAID; Special Consultant to the Secretary of the Treasury; and as consultant to the departments of state and defense, the RAND Corporation, and McKinsey & Co. He has been a member of the President's Committee on International Monetary Arrangements, the Foreign Affairs Task Force of the Democratic Advisory Council of Elected Officials, the U.S. member of U.N. Commissions on economic projections and on international monetary reform, and a director of the Atlantic Council. He is a fellow of the American Academy of Arts and Sciences, a member of the Council of Foreign Relations, and of the US Army Infantry School Hall of Fame. He holds the U.S. Treasury Department's Distinguished Service Award.

== Publications ==
=== Journal articles and newspaper articles ===
Macroeconomics and Macro Policy for the Persistent Lay Reader "Fiscal and Monetary Policy: In Search of a Doctrine" Economic Choices: Studies in Tax/Fiscal Policy, Center for National Policy, 1982; "Must We Retrench?" Foreign Affairs, Spring 1989; "The State of Macroeconomics" Employment and Growth: Issues for the 1980s, Kluwer Academic Publishers 1987; "America's Inflation" The Economist, March 21–27, 1981; "The Energy-Inflation Connection" Washington Post, April 17, 1980; "The Political Economics of International Money" Foreign Affairs, October 1968; "Money and Government" Atlantic Monthly, April 1962; The Question of Government Spending, Harper & Brothers, 1960. Also: "On Deficit Cutting" Regional Review, Federal Reserve Bank of Boston, Summer 1995; "GNP Budgeting: Old Theory, New Reality" Challenge, September–October 1989; "Budgetary Reform: Notes on Principles and Strategy" The Review of Economics and Statistics, May, 1963; "On Government Spending" Proceedings of a Symposium on the Federal Budget, American Bankers Association, 1968; "Fine Tuning" and "Functional Finance" The New Palgrave Dictionary of Economics, 1987; "Saving, Investment, and the Federal Budget: A Primer," Bulletin, Kennedy School of Government, Winter 1990.

Macroeconomic policy since 2008 : "There Is No US Federal Debt Crisis" Financial Times Economists Forum, March 28, 2011; "Should the US Launch a Temporary Fiscal Push Now?" Financial Times, October 29, 2010; "Ignoring realities and ruling out alternatives" Financial Times, October 18, 2010; "Large Scale Federal Fiscal Action is the Key" Financial Times (FT.com) November 26, 2008; "Ways Out of Choppy Financial Waters" Letters, New York Times, November 19, 2008; "Saving the Real Economy" Financial Times Economists Forum, November 3, 2008, and Financial Times, November 4, 2008; "A Matter of Priorities In a Bank Bailout", New York Times Letters, March 28, 2008.

European Policy and Foreign Economic Policy 1964-68: "Lyndon Johnson and Foreign Policy: The Case of Western Europe and the Soviet Union" in Presidential Judgment: Foreign Policy Decision Making in the White House (Hollis Publishing Company, 2001); "The Politics of Alliance" in Agenda for the Nation, ed. Kermit Gordon (Brookings Institution, 1968); "Comment" in Economic Events, Ideas and Policies (Brookings Institution, 2000); "U.S. Foreign Economic Policy: Implications for the Organization of the Executive Branch" Hearings before the Committee on Foreign Affairs Subcommittee on Foreign Economic Policy, House of Representatives, July 25, 1972, GPO, pp. 107–121, 129–137. Also "The Political Economics of International Money" Foreign Affairs, October 1968 ( supra).

President Johnson's 1965 Vietnam decisions: "No Good Choices: LBJ and the Vietnam/Great Society Connection" Presidents Week Lecture, 2006, Occasional Paper, American Academy of Arts and Sciences 2007; and "Inside LBJ's War: A Forum on Francis Bator's 'No Good Choices'", Diplomatic History, June 2008.

=== Books ===
- Thomas Alan Schwartz Lyndon Johnson and Europe, Harvard University Press, 2003
- Kenneth Weisbrode The Atlantic Century Da Capo Press, Persewusa Books Group, 2009
- John Cassidy How Markets Fail Farrar, Straus and Giroux, 2009
- Steve Dryden Trade Warriors Oxford University Press, 1995
- John S. Odell U.S. International Monetary Policy, Princeton University Press, 1982
- Gregory Treverton The Dollar Drain and American Forces in Germany, Ohio University Press, 1978
- Thomas Holderegger Die trilateralen Verhandlungen 1966/1967Hrsg.: Andreas Wenger, ETH Zurich, 2006
- Hans Landsberg et al., Energy: The Next Twenty Years, Ballinger Publishing Company, 1979
- W.H. Bruce Brittain "Two International Monetary Decisions" Commission on the Organization of the Government for the Conduct of Foreign Policy, June 1975, Appendix Vol. 3 pp. 127–138 GPO
- Edward Skloot "The Decision to Send East-West Trade Legislation to Congress, 1965-66" Commission on the Organization of the Government for the Conduct of Foreign Policy, June 1975, Appendix Vol. 3 pp. 72–87 GPO
