= Robert Gabriel Jr. =

American political advisor

Robert Gabriel

United States Deputy National Security Advisor
- In office May 23, 2025 – May 20, 2026 Serving with Andy Baker
- President: Donald Trump
- Preceded by: Alex Wong
- Succeeded by: Michael Needham

Personal details
- Party: Republican
- Education: New York University (BA)

Robert Gabriel Jr. is an American political advisor, speechwriter, and former television producer who served as the United States deputy national security advisor alongside Andy Baker from May 2025 to May 2026.

== Education ==
Gabriel earned his bachelor's in economics with a concentration in policy from New York University.

== Career ==
=== Policy advisor and special assistant (2016–2021) ===
He served as a policy advisor for Donald Trump's 2016 presidential campaign. In January 2017, he was named to Stephen Miller's staff as a special assistant. Gabriel later became an associate producer of The Ingraham Angle (2017–present). By January 2021, he had become a speechwriter for Trump; during the January 6 Capitol attack, he texted an unknown staffer, "Potus im sure is loving this [sic]." That morning, after Vice President Mike Pence told Trump that he would not follow through with Trump's fake electors plot, Gabriel instructed speechwriters to "reinsert the Mike Pence lines," referring to lines Trump wrote directly urging Pence to "refer the illegally submitted electoral votes back to the states".

=== Post-government work (2021–2025) ===
In August 2022, NJ PBS revealed that Gabriel had established a limited liability company that began receiving monthly payments from a political action committee associated with Trump. He was involved in Donald Trump's 2024 presidential campaign as an assistant to Susie Wiles, the campaign manager.

=== Assistant to the president for policy & Deputy National Security Advisor (2025–2026) ===
In January 2025, Gabriel was named as an assistant to the president for policy.

In May 2025, Axios reported that Gabriel was named deputy national security advisor alongside Andy Baker as part of a restructuring effort by Marco Rubio, the acting national security advisor. In January 2026, Gabriel was named as a member of the Board of Peace. He left his position as the deputy national security advisor in May 2026. Gabriel was succeeded by Michael Needham. At the time of his departure, he was considered one of Susie Wiles's closest allies.
