= Gary R. Edson =

American government official and entrepreneur

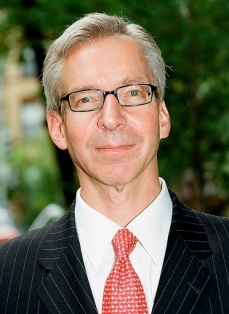
Edson in 2011

Gary Edson is a former American government official, entrepreneur, and former president of Conservation International. He served previously as chief executive officer of the Clinton Bush Haiti Fund, a 501(c)(3) nonprofit organization that concluded operations in late 2012.

== Education ==
Edson received a B.A. with honors in anthropology from Stanford University in 1977, and J.D. and M.B.A. degrees from The University of Chicago in 1982. He was a Henry Luce Scholar in Japan, 1977–1978.

== Career ==
Earlier in his career, Edson served as chief of staff and general counsel to U.S. Trade Representative Carla A. Hills from 1989 to 1992, and special assistant to Deputy Secretary of State Kenneth W. Dam from 1982 to 1985. He headed a private equity firm, ECG, Inc., which acquired PAR Systems, Inc, a manufacturer of robotics systems, of which Edson was chairman of the board.

From 2001 to 2004, Edson served in the administration of George W. Bush as Deputy National Security Advisor and deputy assistant to the president for international economic affairs; he was also Deputy National Economic Advisor. In addition, he was the chief U.S. negotiator or “sherpa” for all presidential summits, including the G8, APEC, US-EU, and the Summits of the Americas.

Edson co-led the development of the $45 billion President's Emergency Plan for AIDS Relief, the largest commitment ever by any nation for an international health initiative. He is also credited with establishing the Millennium Challenge Corporation (MCC) to fight global poverty. The MCC uses increased aid to reward countries demonstrating a commitment to good governance.

Edson left government in 2005 because of a serious illness, from which he has since recovered. He was a managing director at Stonebridge International, and for a time sat on the Fulbright Foreign Scholarship Board.

One observer described Edson as “brainy” and “impatient… a spicy jalapeno pepper in the midst of the smooth cream cheese” of the White House. Former secretary of state James A. Baker has called him “indispensable,” noting, "I've never known anybody from whom the taxpayers get a better deal." In her 2011 memoir, former secretary of state Condoleezza Rice praises Edson as being "one of the best 'policy engineers' I'd ever known, one of those rare individuals who can take an idea from inception to implementation."

In 2020, Edson, along with over 130 other former Republican national security officials, signed a statement that asserted that President Trump was unfit to serve another term, and "To that end, we are firmly convinced that it is in the best interest of our nation that Vice President Joe Biden be elected as the next President of the United States, and we will vote for him."
