= Robert Komer =

American diplomat (1922-2000)

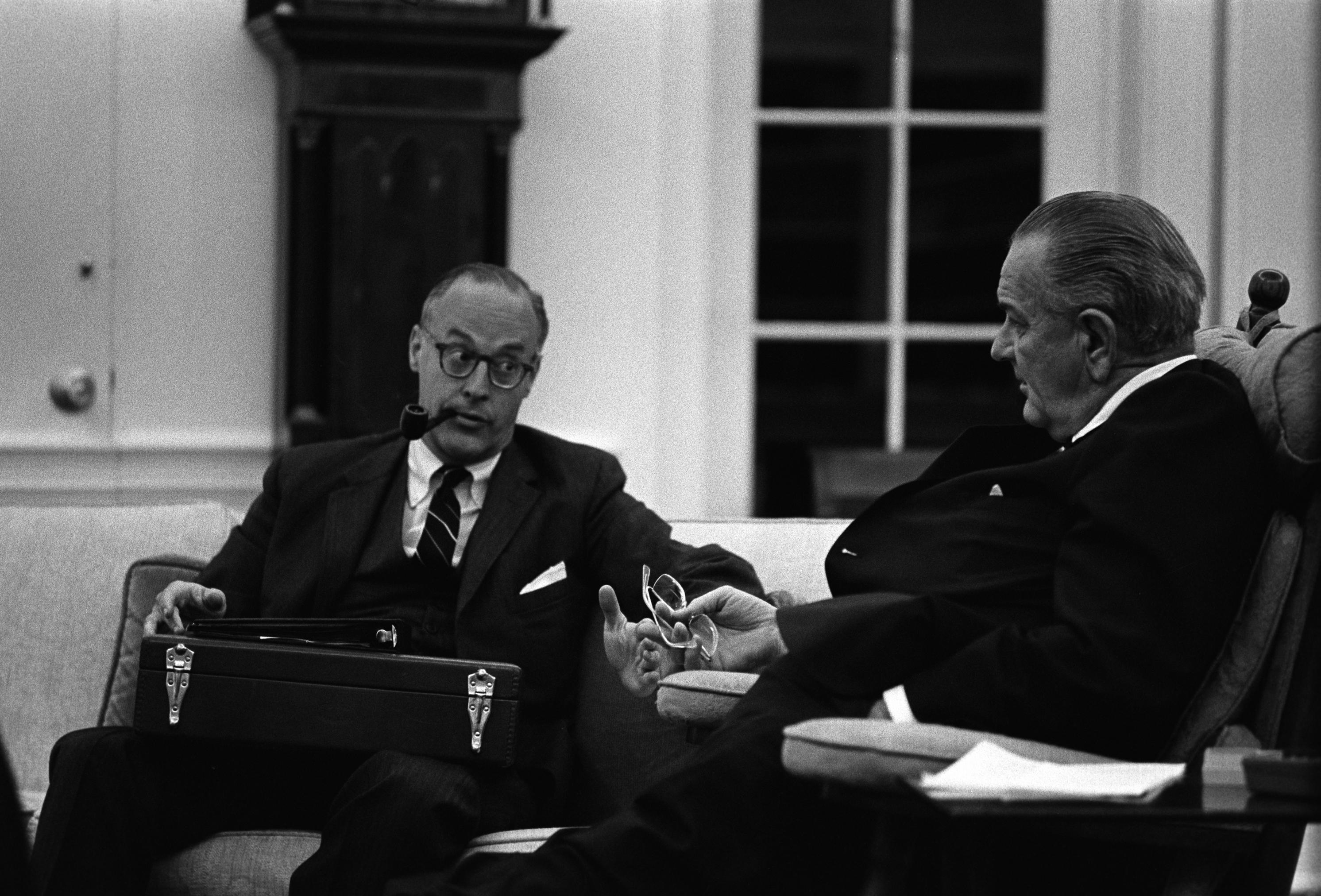
- Komer meeting with Lyndon Johnson

Under Secretary of Defense for Policy
- In office October 24, 1979 – January 20, 1981
- President: Jimmy Carter
- Preceded by: Stanley Rogers Resor
- Succeeded by: Fred Iklé

United States Ambassador to Turkey
- In office December 3, 1968 – May 7, 1969
- President: Lyndon B. Johnson; Richard Nixon
- Preceded by: Parker T. Hart
- Succeeded by: William J. Handley

3rd Deputy National Security Advisor
- In office 1965
- President: Lyndon B. Johnson
- Preceded by: Carl Kaysen
- Succeeded by: Francis M. Bator

Personal details
- Born: Robert William Komer; February 23, 1922 Chicago, Illinois, U.S.
- Died: April 9, 2000 (aged 78) Arlington, Virginia, U.S.
- Education: Harvard University (BA, MBA)
- Nickname: "Blowtorch Bob"

Military service
- Battles/wars: World War II

Robert William "Blowtorch Bob" Komer (February 23, 1922 – April 9, 2000) was an American national security adviser known for managing Civil Operations and Revolutionary Development Support during the Vietnam War.

== Early life and education ==
Born in Chicago, Illinois and raised in St. Louis, Missouri. Komer graduated from Harvard College and Harvard Business School, later training at Camp Ritchie and its Military Intelligence Training Center, making Komer one of the Ritchie Boys. Like many Ritchie Boys, he later joined the Central Intelligence Agency in its infancy in 1947.

== Career ==
Komer worked for the Central Intelligence Agency from 1947 to 1961. For part of that time, he was chief of the Estimates Staff in the Office of National Estimates. In 1961 he went to work in the White House, on the staff of the National Security Council, which was led by McGeorge Bundy. After Bundy's departure, Komer briefly succeeded Bundy as interim National Security Advisor, before he was assigned to the Vietnam pacification campaign.

While with the NSC, Komer and others negotiated with Israeli prime minister Levi Eshkol a memorandum of understanding (MOU) about Israeli nuclear weapons capabilities. The March 10, 1965, MOU, variously interpreted since, said 'Israel would not be the first country to "introduce" nuclear weapons to the Middle East'.

Komer arrived in South Vietnam in May 1967 as the first head of the newly created Civil Operations and Revolutionary Development Support program, the most controversial aspect of which was the Phoenix program, which William Colby later testified resulted in 20,587 deaths. CORDS was an agency with a staff of both civilians and military personnel, but it fell under the authority of the Military Assistance Command, Vietnam. President Lyndon Johnson had sent Komer to South Vietnam to provide impetus to the nation-building efforts of the new organization. Komer was known for his brusque management style, which had endeared him to the president and earned him the nickname "Blowtorch Bob" from U.S. ambassador Henry Cabot Lodge Jr. As head of CORDS, he commanded all pacification personnel in South Vietnam.

However, the problems CORDS faced were intractable and the results of Komer's work ambiguous. In a revealing discussion with military historians, Komer said "everybody and nobody" was responsible for counter-insurgency against the communist Vietcong guerrillas. He said it "fell between stools which accounted for the prolonged failure to push things on a large scale even though many correctly analyzed the need". Komer focused his work on the expansion of village militias loyal to the South Vietnamese government, believing they could provide local security against guerrillas.

Komer left South Vietnam in November 1968 and after working briefly as a consultant for the RAND Corporation was appointed ambassador to Turkey. He was succeeded as head of CORDS by William E. Colby, who would later become head of the CIA.

Ambassador Komer, known for his success in garnering support in a hostile environment like Vietnam, tried to calm down the relations to the Turkish population, which was furious due to the presence of sailors of the United States Navy 6th Fleet in Istanbul, who had an exclusive access to certain theaters. He ordered that the US military presence should be adapted to only the necessary, navy fleet visits were to be halted and NATO facilities would be operated by Turkey. But he was not as successful in Turkey as he was in Vietnam, and he left a special mark in Turkish history: on January 6, 1969, at the beginning of his tenure as the US ambassador to Turkey, his car was set on fire in Middle East Technical University by a group of students who then formed the core of the Marxist-Leninist movement in Turkey under the banner of Dev-Genç. Komer was visiting the campus at the invitation of university president Kemal Kurdaş, who relied on American donors to finance the building of the modern campus.

Komer joined the RAND Corporation in June 1970 as program manager for defense studies, which included RAND's ongoing work in South Vietnam. In July 1970 Komer returned to South Vietnam for a two week visit in which he toured 20 of the 44 provinces to assess the progress of pacification. On his return to the US he optimistically reported to various interested parties that the US and South Vietnam had beaten the Vietcong insurgency and controlled most of the population, but that the South Vietnamese government still needed to secure the support of the population to prevent the North Vietnamese from conducting a protracted struggle while waiting for the US to withdraw.

Komer also later worked in the Jimmy Carter administration as the Under Secretary of Defense for Policy.

In the 1980s, Komer became a vocal critic of "The Maritime Strategy", which was devised by Secretary of the Navy John Lehman. Komer argued against spending the resources for 600 ships, part of a controversial plan to deter and contain the Soviet Union.

== Personal life ==
Robert Komer's first marriage to Jane Komer ended in divorce. He later married Geraldine, who died in 1996.

== Awards and honors ==
On December 23, 1967, he was presented with the Presidential Medal of Freedom by President Lyndon Johnson.

== Death ==
Komer died on April 9, 2000.

== Sources ==
- The American Presidency Project

Government offices
Preceded by Carl Kaysen	Deputy National Security Advisor; 1965	Succeeded by Francis M. Bator
Preceded by Stanley Rogers Resor	Under Secretary of Defense for Policy; 1979–1981	Succeeded by Fred Ikle
Diplomatic posts
Preceded by Parker T. Hart	United States Ambassador to Turkey; 1968–1969	Succeeded by William J. Handley
