= Michael Pyle (economist) =

American government official (born 1977)

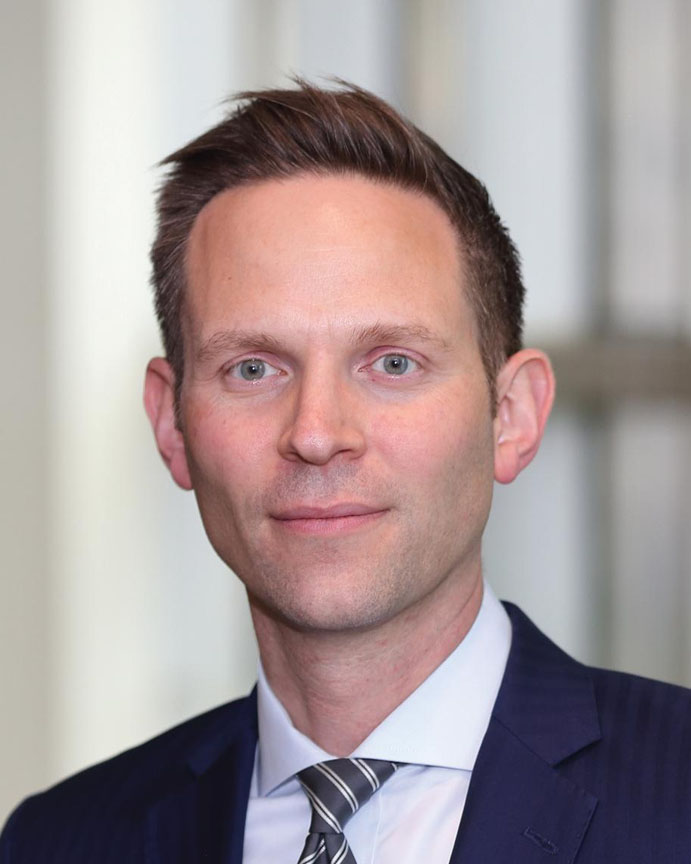
- Official portrait, 2024

United States Deputy National Security Advisor for International Economics
- In office 2022–2024
- President: Joe Biden
- Leader: Jake Sullivan
- Preceded by: Daleep Singh
- Succeeded by: Daleep Singh

Personal details
- Born: 1977 (age 48–49)
- Education: Dartmouth College (BA); Yale University (JD)

Michael Pyle (born 1977) is an American government official and U.S. financier.

Pyle was appointed the Deputy National Security Advisor for International Economics in the Biden White House National Security Council, and was previously the Chief Economist to the Vice President.

He is currently an executive at Blackrock, where he is the deputy head of portfolio management.

== Early life and education ==
Michael Pyle was born in December 1977 to Stephen and Elizabeth (née Campbell) Pyle. He grew up in the small farm town of Harristown, Illinois, just outside of Decatur. He attended Niantic-Harristown High School and graduated in 1996. He graduated in economics at Dartmouth College, second in his class (2000). He then attended Yale Law School, after which he clerked for Judge Merrick Garland of the U.S. Court of Appeals for the D.C. Circuit.

== Career ==
Pyle joined the Obama Administration to work as Office of Management and Budget Director Peter Orszag’s special assistant. He then worked for the Treasury Department’s undersecretary for international affairs, Lael Brainard, before returning to the White House to work for the National Economic Council.

After leaving the Obama administration, Pyle joined BlackRock as an investment strategist, representing investment outlook with clients and across the media. In 2019, he joined Kamala Harris's presidential campaign as an economic advisor.

After the 2020 election, Pyle joined Vice President Kamala Harris's team as her chief economic advisor. In 2022, Pyle replaced Daleep Singh as deputy national security advisor for internal economics, where he focused on global trade and Biden’s international investment agenda.

Pyle’s tenure as deputy national security adviser for international economics included putting together efforts to limit Russia’s revenues from global oil sales. It also included a focus on economic initiatives to compete with China's Belt and Road Initiative.

== Personal life ==
Pyle resides in Brooklyn and is married to Chloe Schama, an editor at Vogue. They have four kids.
