= Jon Finer =

American diplomat (born 1976)

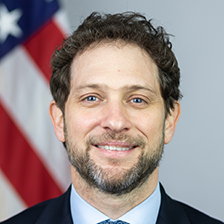
- Finer in 2021

33rd United States Principal Deputy National Security Advisor
- In office January 20, 2021 – January 20, 2025
- President: Joe Biden
- Preceded by: Matthew Pottinger
- Succeeded by: Alex Wong

28th Director of Policy Planning
- In office March 7, 2016 – January 20, 2017
- President: Barack Obama
- Preceded by: David McKean
- Succeeded by: Brian H. Hook

Chief of Staff to the Secretary of State
- In office March 8, 2015 – January 20, 2017
- President: Barack Obama
- Secretary: John Kerry
- Preceded by: David Wade
- Succeeded by: Margaret Peterlin

Personal details
- Born: 1976 (age 49–50) Norwich, Vermont, U.S.
- Party: Democratic
- Education: Harvard University (BA); Balliol College, Oxford (MPhil); Yale University (JD)

Jonathan Finer (born 1976) is an American journalist and civil servant who served as deputy national security advisor under national security advisor Jake Sullivan in the Biden administration. He previously served as the chief of staff and director of policy planning for former Secretary of State John Kerry at the U.S. Department of State.

== Early life and education ==
Finer was born in Norwich, Vermont, the eldest of four children. His parents were Susan (née Burack) and Chad Finer. His mother was the principal of the Frances C. Richmond School and his father a doctor. He is Jewish.

Finer graduated from Hanover High School in Hanover, New Hampshire in 1994. He attended Harvard University, where he developed an interest in international relations after spending time working for the Labour Party in the United Kingdom. While at Harvard, he covered sports for The Harvard Crimson. He earned a Juris Doctor from Yale Law School, where he co-founded the Iraqi Refugee Assistance Project, and an M.Phil. in international relations from Balliol College, Oxford, where he was a Rhodes Scholar. Finer also spent a year in Hong Kong as a Henry Luce Foundation Scholar, working as a reporter and editor at the Far Eastern Economic Review.

== Career ==
Finer was a foreign and national correspondent at the Washington Post, where he reported from more than twenty countries and spent eighteen months covering the war in Iraq, embedding with the U.S. Marines during the 2003 invasion and based in Baghdad in 2005–2006. He also covered conflicts in Gaza (2009), Russia/Georgia (2008) and Israel/Lebanon (2006); the 2004 U.S. presidential campaign; and the 2004 Major League Baseball playoffs.

Finer and U.S. Secretary of State John Kerry with Saudi Crown Prince Muhammad bin Nayef in Jeddah, Saudi Arabia, May 15, 2016

Finer joined the Obama administration in 2009 as a White House Fellow, assigned to the Office of the White House Chief of Staff and the National Security Council staff. At the White House, he also served as special advisor for the Middle East and North Africa and foreign policy speechwriter for Vice President Joseph R. Biden and later as senior advisor to deputy national security advisor Antony Blinken.

From March 7, 2016, to January 20, 2017, Finer served as Director of Policy Planning. Prior to his appointment as chief of staff and Director of Policy Planning at the State Department, Finer previously served as deputy chief of staff for policy.

After concluding his work with the State Department, Finer joined the New York private equity firm Warburg Pincus and served as a senior fellow for U.S. foreign policy at the Council on Foreign Relations. He is a former member of the board of directors for the Truman National Security Project.

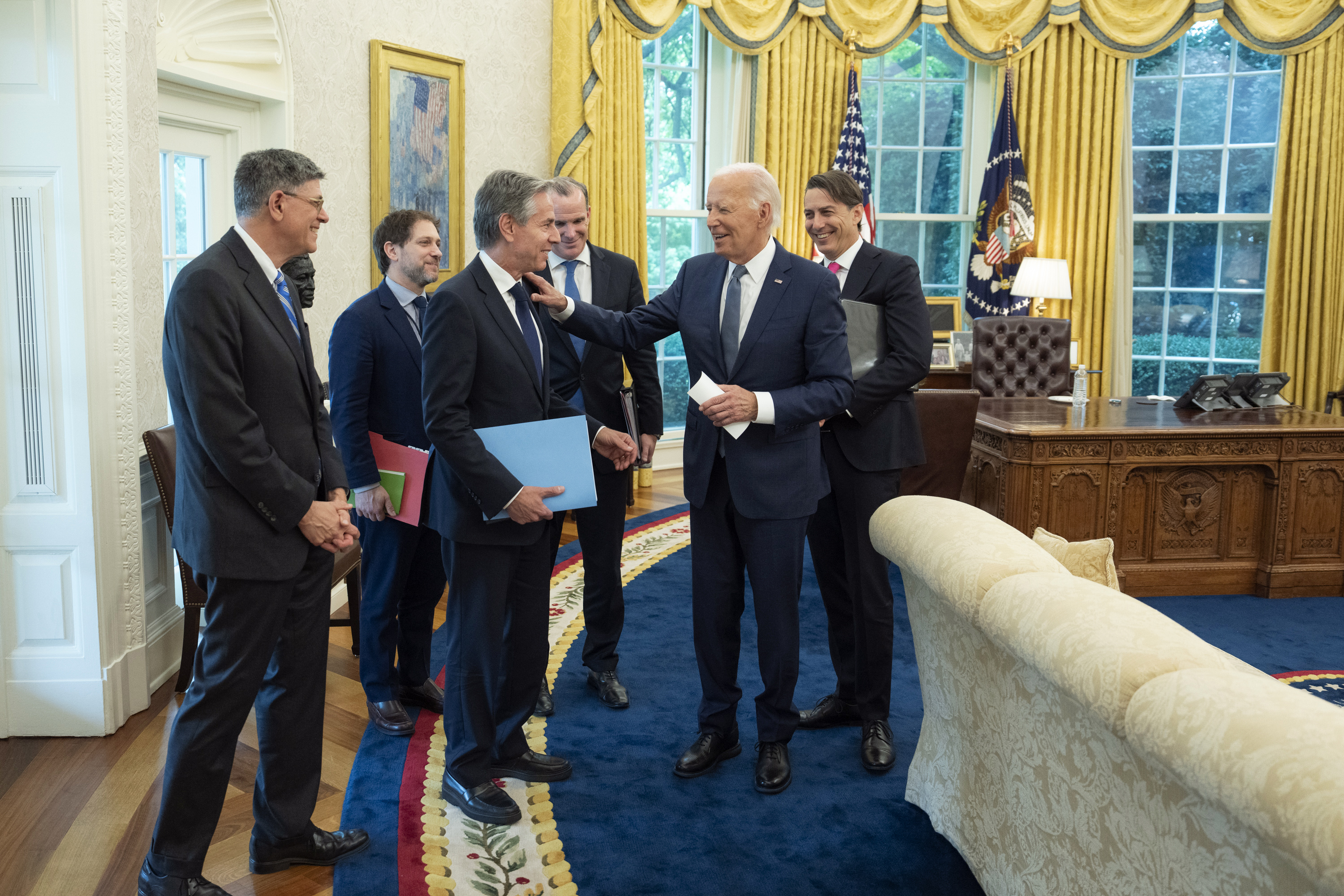
Finer with Joe Biden, Antony Blinken, Brett McGurk, Jack Lew and Amos Hochstein after a meeting with Israeli Prime Minister Benjamin Netanyahu in the Oval Office, July 25, 2024

Finer was deputy national security advisor under national security advisor Jake Sullivan, serving for the entirety of the Biden administration.

In November 2023 during an interview with Meet the Press, Finer refused to say if Israel was following international law after Israeli forces invaded Gaza's main hospital, Al-Shifa. Tariq Habash, a Biden appointee who resigned over Gaza policy, said Finer told him and other officials the US had credible intelligence that there was a Hamas military base beneath Al-Shifa days before the invasion of the hospital, which led to the deaths of premature babies in incubators. Within a month, a Washington Post investigation refuted evidence the hospital was a military site, after CNN and the BBC declared IDF videos showing weapons in the hospital staged and the New York Times and Associated Press dismissed IDF proof of a command center as insufficient. Senators who received classified intelligence briefings said there were "important differences" between what the Biden administration's public claims about the hospital and actual intelligence.

In August 2024, Finer stated in a CNN interview that the US was "putting as much pressure as we can" to achieve a Gaza hostage and ceasefire deal. Israeli officials would later admit Biden never demanded a ceasefire, expressing gratitude "the administration never came to us and said 'ceasefire now.'"

Among the handful of core Biden policymakers on Gaza, Finer reportedly most recognized Palestinian suffering and pushed for pauses on weapons shipments. He also frequently brought up concerns of alienating "pro-Israel forces" in the US.

In January 2025, Columbia University’s Center on Global Energy Policy announced Finer as a Distinguished Policy Fellow.

In November 2025, Jake Sullivan and Finer launched The Long Game, a weekly podcast in which they analyze current news and present U.S. policy choices from their perspectives as former White House National Security Advisor and Deputy National Security Advisor, respectively.

In February 2026, Finer revealed for the first time, in the Truth in Testimony disclosure required for witnesses before Congress, that he had taken a role at Anduril, the weapons manufacturer.

In September 2026, Finer, in an interview with Peter Beinart, defended working on Gaza policy under the Biden administration arguing resigning over disagreement was "self-serving" and "performative."

Finer joined the Tsai Leadership Program at Yale Law School in 2026.

Diplomatic posts
Preceded by David McKean	Director of Policy Planning; 2016–2017	Succeeded by Brian H. Hook
Government offices
Preceded by Matthew Pottinger	United States Deputy National Security Advisor; 2021–2025	Succeeded by Alex Nelson Wong
