= Censorship in the European Union =

European Union governing bodies have the power to regulate certain types of speech in member countries.

== Legal landscape ==
Article 11 of the Charter of Fundamental Rights of the European Union protects freedom of expression, and "the freedom to hold opinions and to receive and impart information and ideas without interference by public authority and regardless of frontiers."

The exercise of these freedoms may be subject to restrictions or penalties "as are prescribed by law and are necessary in a democratic society, in the interests of national security, territorial integrity or public safety, for the prevention of disorder or crime, for the protection of health or morals, for the protection of the reputation or rights of others, for preventing the disclosure of information received in confidence, or for maintaining the authority and impartiality of the judiciary." If an actor is affiliated with a foreign state, it additionally cannot invoke protection under the Charter of Fundamental Rights.

== Examples ==
=== Russian state media ===
Council of the European Union Regulation 2022/350, passed in 2022, bans "transmission or distribution by any means" of any content from sanctioned Russian state media actors. The regulation led to a ban on Russia Today and Sputnik within the EU, as well as subsequent bans on other major outlets. According to a 2022 Institute for Strategic Dialogue study, the ban caused a reduction in EU traffic to sites associated with Russia Today or Rossiya Segodnya (Sputnik's parent company) by an average of 74%.

The European Union justified the regulation as necessary to counter Russian propaganda following the 2022 Russian invasion of Ukraine, and to protect the stability and cohesion of the European Union and its member states. Notable critics of the ban included the European Federation of Journalists, which stated it "fears the effects of this spiral of censorship on freedom of expression in Europe", and the International Press Institute. According to academics Natali Helberger of the University of Amsterdam and Wolfgang Schulz of the Hans-Bredow-Institut, the scope of the law was far greater than any EU content moderation beforehand, as it was a sweeping ban on both audiovisual and social media content.

In March 2025, European Parliament Vice-President Pina Picierno notably pressured Italian state broadcaster RAI to cancel an interview with sanctioned Russian TV presenter Vladimir Solovyov.

The authorities of Saarland filed criminal proceedings against three of its citizens for including videos produced by Russia Today in their non-for-profit websites. The judge referred the matter to the EU Court of Justice, which ruled that the ban applies to any website and to any broadcasting, irrespective of its content (propaganda or not).

==== Legal precedent ====
The ban was upheld at the European Union's General Court in July 2022 after a lawsuit by Russia Today France, with the court ruling that the ban was proportionate and legal due to the channel's broadcasting of pro-war propaganda and support for Ukraine's destabilization. The ruling stated that Russia Today's broadcast of "information justifying the military aggression against Ukraine" was "capable of constituting a significant and direct threat to the Union's public order and security". The Court also upheld the ban in March 2025 after a lawsuit by three Dutch internet service providers.

Seamus Allen of the Institute of International and European Affairs argued that through Regulation 2022/350, the EU had given itself "the power to engage in censorship based on subjective criteria", and that the law's precedent would empower the EU to later misuse, and can be used to suppress media freedom and dissent. Dr. Björnstjern Baade of the Freie Universität Berlin concluded that the ban was lawful if it was justified as banning "propaganda for war", and that it differed from "authoritarian" censorship "by virtue of the [European Union's] character as a community of law", while noting that "great care must be taken to ensure that the justification employed does not establish a precedent that becomes problematic as a slippery slope later on."

=== Regulation 2021/784 ===
Regulation 2021/784 addressing the dissemination of terrorist content online, passed in April 2021, contains a provision that allows an EU country to request instant removal of content designated as "terrorist". The provision was criticized as enabling censorship by European Digital Rights, Access Now and other civil society organizations, who argued it could be misused by governments or lead to social media platforms incorrectly using automated content moderation to remove legal speech.

=== Digital Services Act ===
The EU Digital Services Act, passed in 2022, compels online platforms to remove illegal content including hate speech and misinformation within the European Union. Under the DSA, the EU can suspend access to a platform under the DSA if it determines its breach of law "persists and causes serious harm to users and entails criminal offences involving threat to persons' life or safety".

The DSA mandates that online platforms adopt "reasonable, proportionate and effective" measures to mitigate "systemic risks" in four categories: dissemination of illegal content; negative effects for the exercise of fundamental rights; negative effects on civic discourse and electoral processes, and public security; and negative effects in relation to gender-based violence, the protection of public health and minors and serious negative consequences to the person's physical and mental well-being health crises.

In 2023, European Commissioner for Internal Market Thierry Breton suggested using the DSA to shut down social media platforms if they don't remove content inciting civil unrest. After 65 civil society organizations asked Breton for clarification, he issued a statement that the EU opposes blocking or limiting content on an arbitrary basis.

A 2024 report by the Future of Free Speech think tank at Vanderbilt University found that "a substantial majority" (87.5% to 99.7%) of comments deleted under the DSA on Facebook and YouTube in France, Germany, and Sweden were "legally permissible". The study suggested that "platforms, pages, or channels may be over-removing content to avoid regulatory penalties" under the DSA.

According to a March 2025 statement by Henna Virkkunen, the EU's Executive Vice-president of the European Commission for Technological Sovereignty, Security and Democracy, the European Union or national regulators "have no power to moderate content or to impose any specific approach to moderation" under the DSA.
