= PGIM =

American Investment Management firm

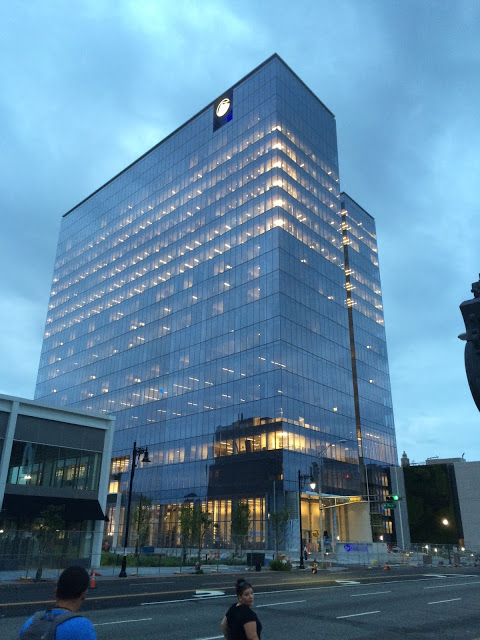
- Prudential Tower, PGIM's headquarters in Newark, New Jersey
- Formerly: Prudential Investment Management; Pramerica Investment Management
- Type: Private
- Industry: Financial services
- Headquarters: Newark, New Jersey
- Products: Asset management; Risk management; Investment management; Wealth management; Life insurance; Mutual funds; Exchange-traded funds; Index funds
- AUM: US$1.5 trillion (2020)
- Parent: Prudential Financial
- Website: pgim.com

PGIM, Inc. (PGIM), formerly known as Prudential Global Investment Management, functions as the asset management arm of Prudential Financial, an American life insurance company.

Headquartered in Newark, New Jersey, United States, PGIM manages more than $1 trillion in assets across its fixed income, equity, real estate, alternatives, and multi-asset channels, including $283 billion for retail investors, and $553 billion for institutional clients, as of December 2019. Jacques Chappuis is president and chief executive officer of PGIM, a leading global asset manager across public and private asset classes.

== History ==
PGIM traces its history to the founding of its parent company, Prudential Financial, in 1875.

PGIM is currently one of the 10 largest asset managers in the world, with more than 1,100 investment professionals working for the company across 31 offices. The firm is headquartered in the Prudential Tower in Newark, New Jersey, which currently houses approximately 3,000 employees from a variety of PGIM's investment management divisions.

== Structure ==
PGIM follows a multi-manager model divided into several autonomous businesses:

=== PGIM Fixed Income ===
PGIM Fixed Income is the fixed income investment arm of PGIM, with $968 billion in assets under management as of December 31, 2020. PGIM Fixed Income focuses on investing in the global fixed income markets through offices in the US, London, Amsterdam, Zurich, Munich, Hong Kong, Tokyo and Singapore.

=== Jennison Associates ===
Founded in 1969, Jennison Associates is the fundamental equity investment arm of PGIM, with $194 billion in assets under management as of April 2024. The firm also invests in active fixed income, with approximately 30% of its total AUM invested in non-equity securities. Jennison has offices in New York and Boston.

=== PGIM Quantitative Solutions ===
PGIM Quantitative Solutions, formerly QMA, is a subsidiary of PGIM that provides quantitative equity and global Multi-Asset solutions. Founded in 1975, it has $120 billion in assets under management as of December 31, 2020.

PGIM Quantitative Solutions uses factor investing in its quantitative process. The firm has drawn attention to their approaches to behavioral bias and momentum investing, unstructured data analysis, and more recently ESG. In 2016, QMA developed Target Date glidepaths and Prudential launched Day One Target Date Funds for retirement investors.

In January 2019 PGIM acquired Wadhwani Asset Management and merged it with the QMA unit, creating QMA Wadhwani LLP.

PGIM Quantitative Solutions is headquartered in Newark, NJ, with locations in San Francisco, CA and London.

=== PGIM Private Capital ===
PGIM Private Capital manages $101 billion in private placements and mezzanine debt as of December 31, 2020.

=== PGIM Real Estate ===
PGIM Real Estate is the global real estate investment arm of PGIM, with professionals in 32 cities around the world. The firm has consistently been the largest manager of worldwide institutional assets according to Pensions & Investments, an industry publication.

In 2020, PGIM Real Estate merged their debt and equity businesses.

As of December 31, 2020 net AUM for PGIM Real Estate was $180 billion.

=== PGIM Investments ===
PGIM Investments is the retail distribution division of PGIM and offers investment advisory services for investments, assets and portfolio management.

In 2018, PGIM Investments entered the exchange-traded fund space with the launch of the PGIM Ultra Short Bond.

As of December 31, 2020, the firm had recorded mutual fund assets under management of $160 billion, with $21.7 billion in net mutual fund flows.

=== PGIM Global Partners ===
Established in 1998, PGIM Global Partners operates asset management companies outside the US, with assets valued at $96 billion as of March 2020.

== Rebranding ==
In January 2016, Prudential Investment Management changed its name to PGIM (= Prudential Global Investment Management) in an effort to unify the brand as the firm expanded its global reach. Prior to the change, PGIM used the pseudonym Pramerica in many countries outside of the United States, where UK-based insurer Prudential plc retained the rights to the Prudential name.

PGIM Fixed Income, QMA and PGIM Real Estate are signatories of the UN Principles for Responsible Investment.

The firm's headquarters, the Prudential Tower, is LEED Gold certified and features a rainwater retention irrigation system, a rooftop garden and walking track, two living green walls, and a parking garage outfitted with electric car charging stations.

In 2021, PGIM Real Estate committed to reduce the operational carbon emissions of its global portfolio of managed properties to net zero by 2050...
