= Alex Nelson Wong =

American government official (born 1980)

Alex Wong
- 黄之瀚
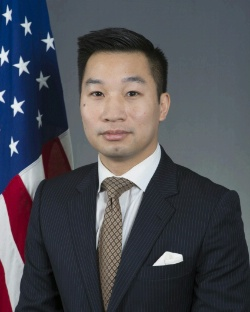
- Official portrait, 2017

34th United States Principal Deputy National Security Advisor
- In office January 20, 2025 – May 1, 2025
- President: Donald Trump
- Preceded by: Jon Finer
- Succeeded by: Robert Gabriel Jr.

Personal details
- Born: Alex Nelson Wong; 1980 (age 45–46)
- Party: Republican
- Spouse: Candice Chiu (m. 2014)
- Education: University of Pennsylvania (BA); Harvard University (JD)

Alex Nelson Wong (Chinese: 黄之瀚; pinyin: Huáng Zhīhàn; born 1980) is an American government official and lawyer who served as the principal deputy national security advisor in the second Trump administration from January to May 2025. He was the deputy assistant secretary for North Korea in the Bureau of East Asian and Pacific Affairs from 2017 to 2021.

== Education ==
Wong's parents immigrated to the United States from Hong Kong. Wong graduated from the University of Pennsylvania with a bachelor's degree with majors in English literature and French. He completed a Juris Doctor from Harvard Law School, where he was the managing editor of the Harvard Law Review and an editor of the Harvard International Law Journal. Wong clerked for Janice Rogers Brown of the United States Court of Appeals for the District of Columbia Circuit.

== Career ==
Wong worked in private practice with a Washington, D.C.-based international law firm. He provided Fortune 100 clients strategic and legal advice on international trade matters, governmental investigations, and regulatory compliance.

From 2007 to 2009, Wong served as Iraq rule of law advisor for the U.S. Department of State, designing and managing the department's efforts to bolster Iraq's judicial branch and anticorruption agencies. Wong served as the foreign and legal policy director for the Mitt Romney 2012 presidential campaign. In that role, he was the campaign's chief official responsible for developing foreign, defense, intelligence, judicial, and law enforcement policy and closely advising the nominees on these matters.

Wong was the foreign policy advisor and general counsel to U.S. senator Tom Cotton. He was Cotton's chief advisor on all issues related to national security, international relations, and law enforcement. He was also his legal counsel.

During the first Trump administration, Wong oversaw regional and security affairs for the Bureau of East Asian and Pacific Affairs (EAP), including U.S. Indo-Pacific strategy. On December 1, 2017, was appointed deputy assistant secretary for North Korea in the EAP. He was dual-hatted as the deputy special representative for North Korea. In these roles, he managed all diplomatic and technical policy on North Korea in support of the United States special representative for North Korea, Stephen Biegun.

On November 22, 2024, Wong was chosen by U.S. president-elect Donald Trump to serve as an assistant to the president and as the principal deputy national security advisor. On March 11, 2025, Wong was mentioned by name when Mike Waltz invited journalist Jeffrey Goldberg into a Signal group chat about a strike on Houthis in Yemen. Wong also came under attack by pro-Trump influencer Laura Loomer, who asked Trump to fire him during a meeting in the Oval Office on April 2. Loomer later denigrated Wong as the "Chinese Deputy National Security Adviser" and accused him of working on behalf of the Chinese Communist Party.

On May 1, 2025, it was announced that Alex Wong and Mike Waltz would leave their posts following the group chat leaks on messaging platform Signal and Waltz's nomination as United States ambassador to the United Nations.

== Personal life ==
Wong married Candice Chiu Wong on April 12, 2014.
