= Jake Sullivan =

American attorney and advisor (born 1976)

- Official portrait, 2021

28th United States National Security Advisor
- In office January 20, 2021 – January 20, 2025
- President: Joe Biden
- Deputy: Jonathan Finer
- Preceded by: Robert C. O'Brien
- Succeeded by: Mike Waltz

National Security Advisor to the Vice President
- In office February 26, 2013 – August 1, 2014
- Vice President: Joe Biden
- Preceded by: Antony Blinken
- Succeeded by: Colin Kahl

26th Director of Policy Planning
- In office February 4, 2011 – February 15, 2013
- President: Barack Obama
- Preceded by: Anne-Marie Slaughter
- Succeeded by: David McKean

Personal details
- Born: Jacob Jeremiah Sullivan; November 28, 1976 (age 49) Burlington, Vermont, U.S.
- Party: Democratic
- Spouse: Maggie Goodlander (m. 2015)
- Education: Yale University (BA, JD); Magdalen College, Oxford (MPhil)

Jacob Jeremiah Sullivan (born November 28, 1976) is an American attorney who served as the U.S. national security advisor from 2021 to 2025 under President Joe Biden.

Sullivan previously served as Director of Policy to President Barack Obama, National Security Advisor to then-Vice President Biden and Deputy Chief of Staff to Secretary Hillary Clinton at the U.S. Department of State. Sullivan also served as senior advisor to the U.S. federal government at the Iran nuclear negotiations and senior policy advisor to Clinton's 2016 presidential campaign, as well as visiting professor at Yale Law School.

On November 23, 2020, President-elect Biden announced that Sullivan would be appointed the National Security Advisor. He took office on January 20, 2021. He left office when Biden's term ended. Since leaving office, he joined the faculty of Harvard Kennedy School. In 2026, Sullivan joined the advisory board of New Era Capital Partners, an Israeli-American venture capital fund.

== Early life and education ==
Sullivan was born in Burlington, Vermont, to a family of Irish descent and grew up in Minneapolis, Minnesota. His father worked for the Star Tribune and was a professor at the University of Minnesota School of Journalism and Mass Communication, and his mother was a high school guidance counselor. Sullivan attended Southwest High School in Minneapolis, where he graduated in 1994. He was a Coca-Cola Scholar, debate champion, president of the student council, and voted "most likely to succeed" in his class.

Educated in the United States and United Kingdom, Sullivan first attended Yale University, where he majored in international studies and political science and was awarded the Alpheus Henry Snow Prize. He was inducted into Phi Beta Kappa his senior year and graduated summa cum laude with distinction in 1998 with a Bachelor of Arts. Sullivan won a Rhodes Scholarship to attend Magdalen College, Oxford, where he studied international relations. He was also awarded a Marshall Scholarship, which he declined in favor of the Rhodes. While at Oxford, Sullivan served as a managing editor of the Oxford International Review. He graduated with a Master of Philosophy. He graduated with a Juris Doctor from Yale Law School in 2003. He is a member, and former board member, of the Truman National Security Project.

At Yale, he was an editor of the Yale Law Journal, the Yale Law & Policy Review, and the Yale Daily News. He interned at the Council on Foreign Relations, was a member of the Yale Debate Association, and earned a Truman Scholarship in his junior year. He also worked for Brookings Institution president Strobe Talbott at the Yale Center for the Study of Globalization.

== Early career ==
After graduating from law school, Sullivan clerked for Judge Guido Calabresi of the United States Court of Appeals for the Second Circuit and then for Associate Justice Stephen Breyer of the United States Supreme Court. After his clerkships, Sullivan returned to his hometown of Minneapolis to practice law at Faegre & Benson and taught law as an adjunct professor at the University of St. Thomas School of Law. After Faegre & Benson, Sullivan worked as chief counsel to Minnesota senator Amy Klobuchar, who connected him to Hillary Clinton.

=== Obama administration ===
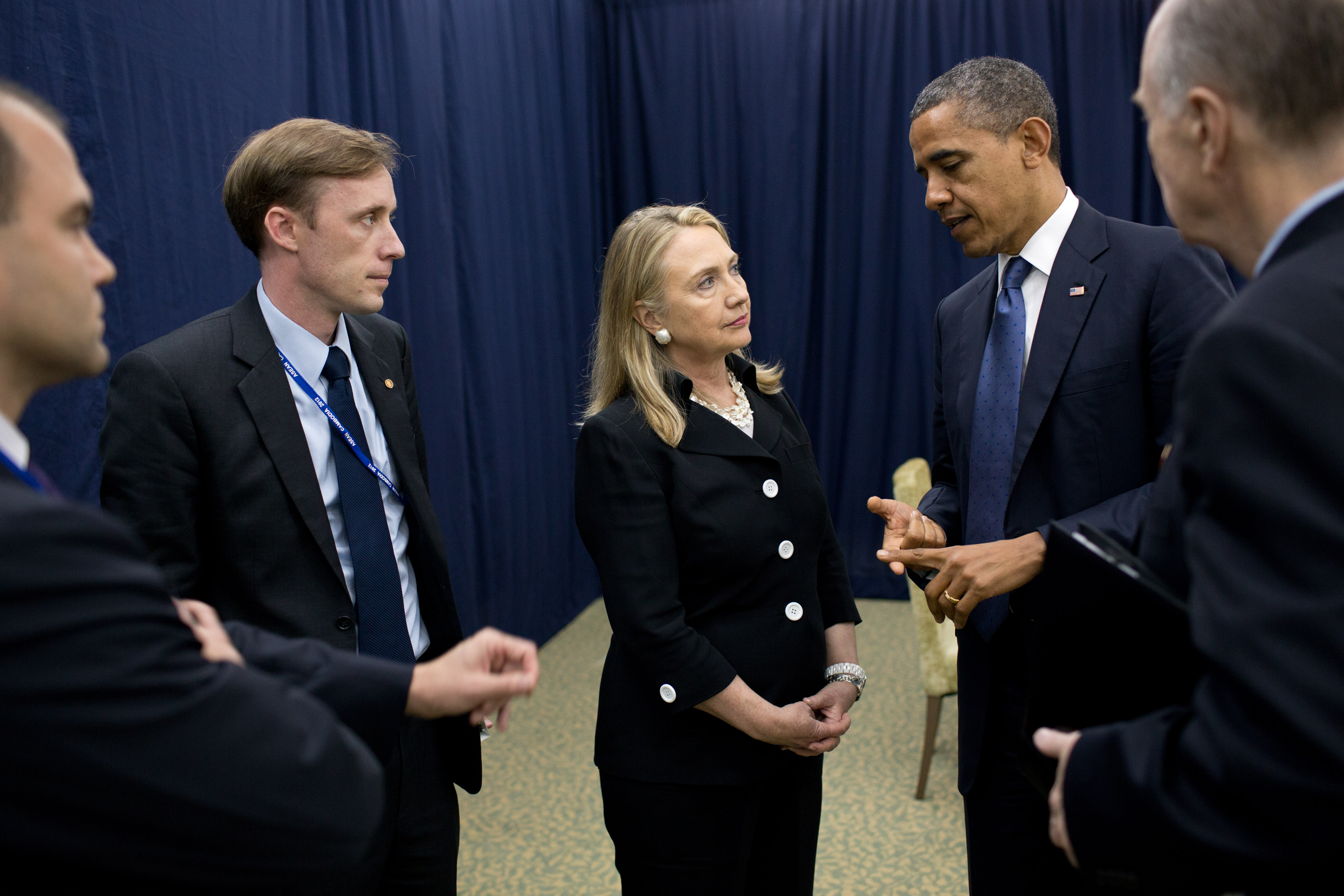
Sullivan, Hillary Clinton and Barack Obama in November 2012

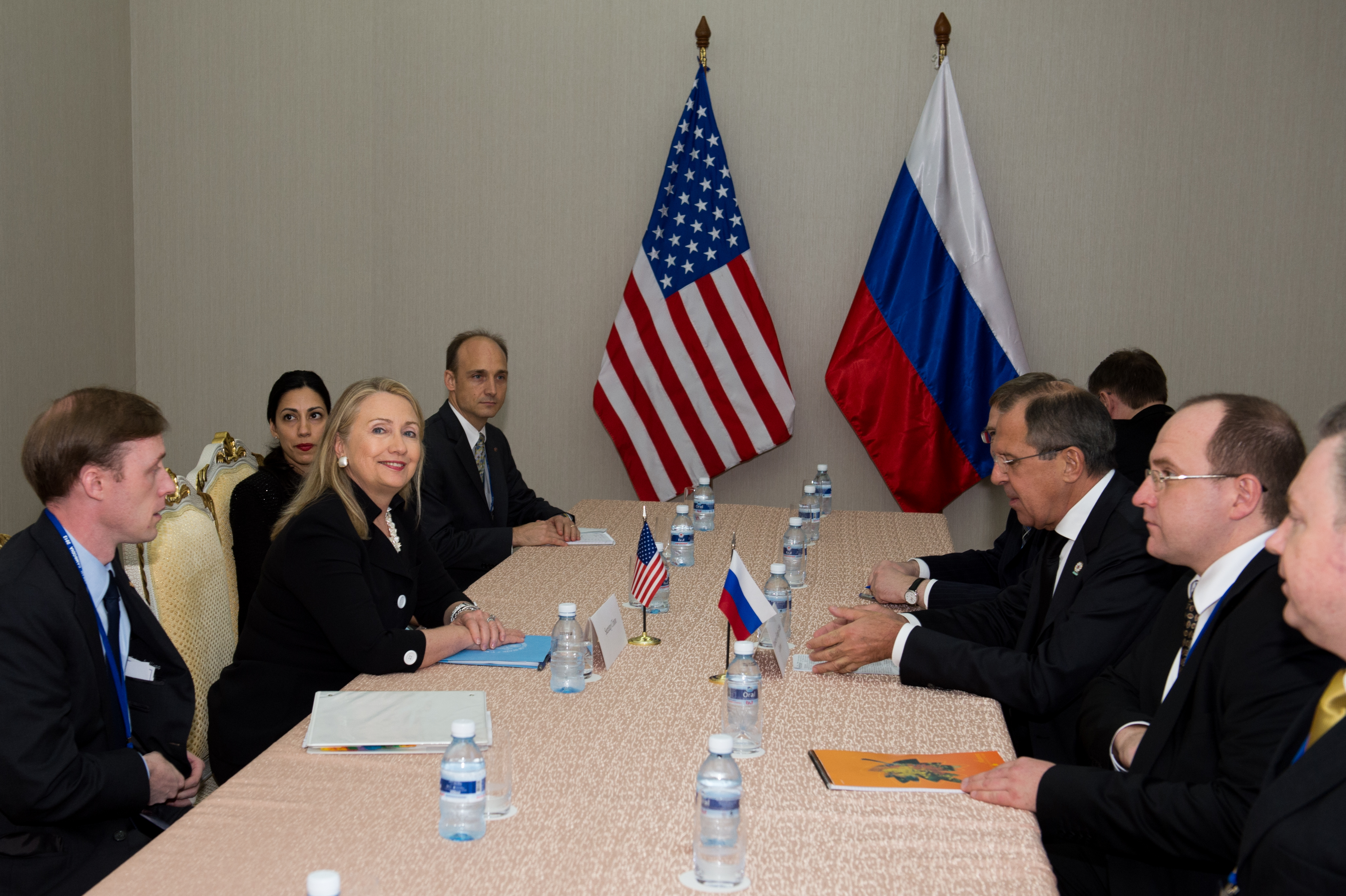
Sullivan, Clinton and Sergey Lavrov in November 2012

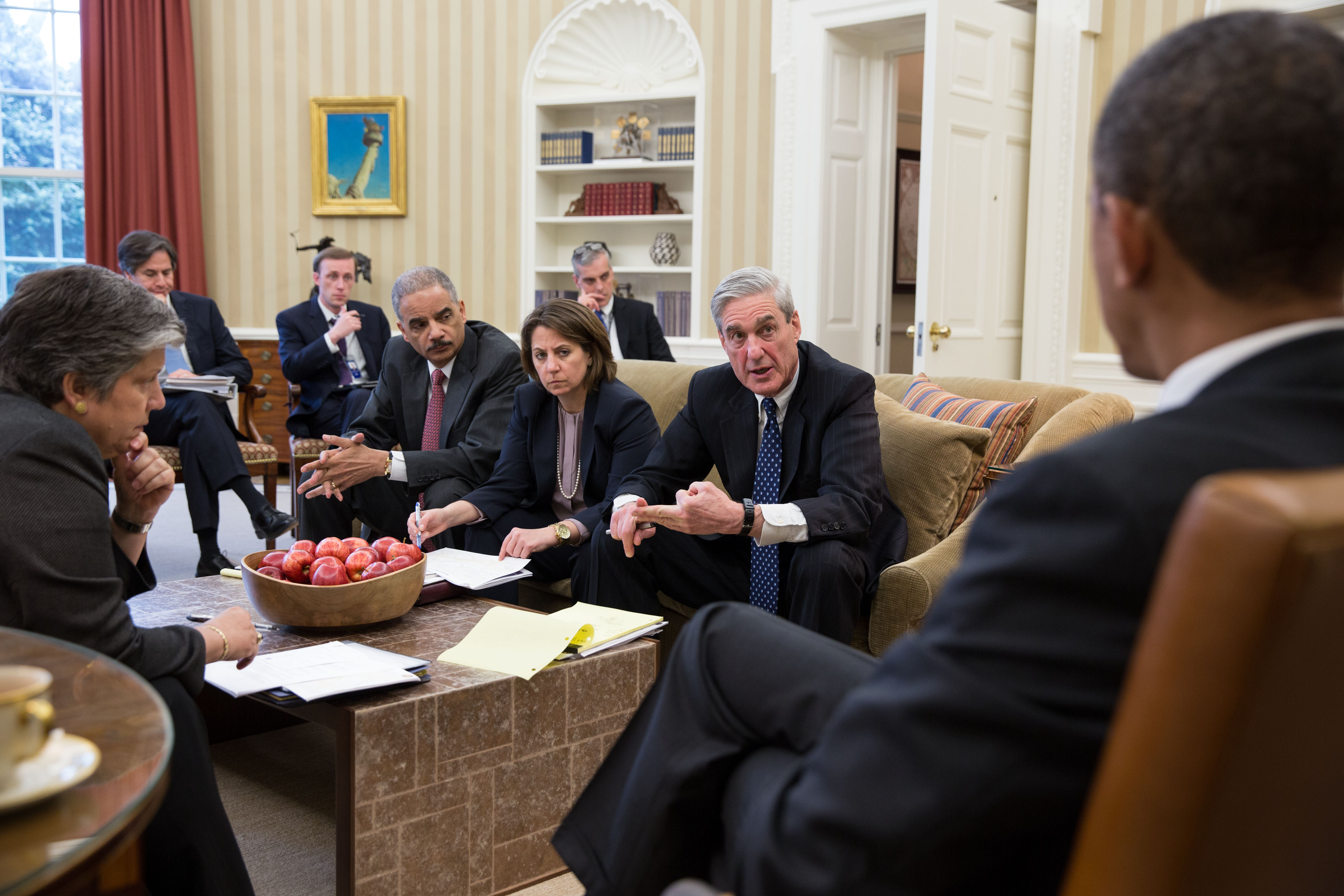
Sullivan with President Obama discussing the 2013 Boston Marathon bombings

In 2008, Sullivan was an advisor to Hillary Clinton during the primary cycle and then to Barack Obama during the general election campaign. He prepared Clinton and Obama for debates. When Clinton became secretary of state, Sullivan was named her deputy chief of staff and Director of Policy Planning, and traveled with her to 112 countries. In 2012, Sullivan approvingly wrote that Al-Qaeda "was on our side in Syria" to Clinton. Clinton later joked that Sullivan was a potential future president of the United States.

Sullivan worked in the Obama administration as deputy assistant to the president and National Security Advisor to Vice President Joe Biden. He became Biden's top security aide in February 2013 after Clinton stepped down as secretary of state. In those posts, he played a role in shaping U.S. foreign policy towards Libya, Syria, and Myanmar.

On June 20, 2014, The New York Times reported that Sullivan was leaving the administration in August 2014 to teach at Yale Law School. As of 2020, he was a nonresident senior fellow at the Carnegie Endowment for International Peace.

==== Iran nuclear negotiations ====
In November 2013, the Associated Press reported that officials in the Obama administration had been in secret contact with Iranian officials throughout 2013 about the feasibility of an agreement over the Iranian nuclear program. The report stated that American officials, including Deputy Secretary of State William J. Burns, Senior White House Iran Advisor Puneet Talwar, and Sullivan, had secretly met with their Iranian counterparts at least five times face to face in Oman. Those efforts paved the way for the Geneva interim agreement on the Iranian nuclear program, known officially as the Joint Plan of Action, signed by Iran and the P5+1 countries in Geneva, Switzerland, on November 24, 2013.

Since then, Sullivan has regularly attended bilateral consultations with Iran in Geneva as a member of the U.S. delegation on the Iran nuclear negotiations.

=== 2016 Clinton presidential campaign ===
Sullivan was Hillary Clinton's chief foreign policy adviser during her 2016 bid for the presidency.

He was reported to be the only senior staffer who repeatedly suggested that Clinton should spend more time in Midwestern swing states during the election campaign. Clinton's failure to win those states was a key factor in her defeat. Sullivan was prominent in many of the Podesta emails released during the 2016 US presidential election, including Sullivan questioning if Democratic primary candidate Martin O'Malley's 100% clean energy by 2050 plan was "realistic". After the election, Sullivan confessed to feeling "a keen sense of responsibility" for Clinton's defeat. On March 24, 2022, former president Donald Trump sued numerous people including Clinton and Sullivan alleging a conspiracy by the Clinton campaign to invent the Russian collusion scandal. The suit was dismissed on September 8, 2022, and on January 19, 2023, a federal judge imposed nearly $1 million in sanctions on Trump and his lawyer Alina Habba, calling the suit "completely frivolous".

=== Macro Advisory Partners and Microsoft ===
After his work with the Clinton campaign, Sullivan joined Macro Advisory Partners, a risk advisory company, in January 2017; it paid him at least $135,000. While at the London-based advisory firm, he advised a number of companies including Uber, Mastercard, Lego, as well as large investment groups such as Bank of America, Aviva, Standard Life Aberdeen, and Standard Chartered. Following the Clinton campaign, he joined the Carsey School of Public Policy at the University of New Hampshire as a member of the faculty and senior fellow.

Between 2017 and May 2020, Sullivan served on an advisory council for Microsoft; in 2020, he was paid $45,000 for this work. Given his role in crafting U.S. cyber security policy in the Biden administration, including overseeing the government's response to the January 2021 cyberattack on Microsoft, concerns have been raised about potential conflicts of interest.

== National security advisor ==
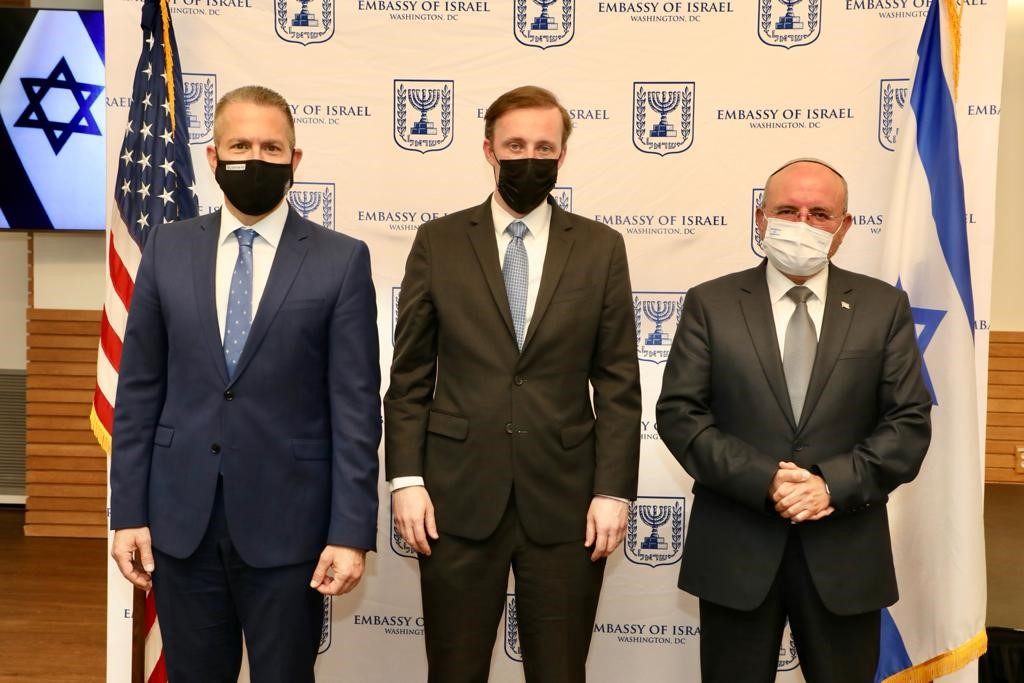
Sullivan with Israel's National Security Adviser Meir Ben-Shabbat and Israel's ambassador Gilad Erdan in April 2021

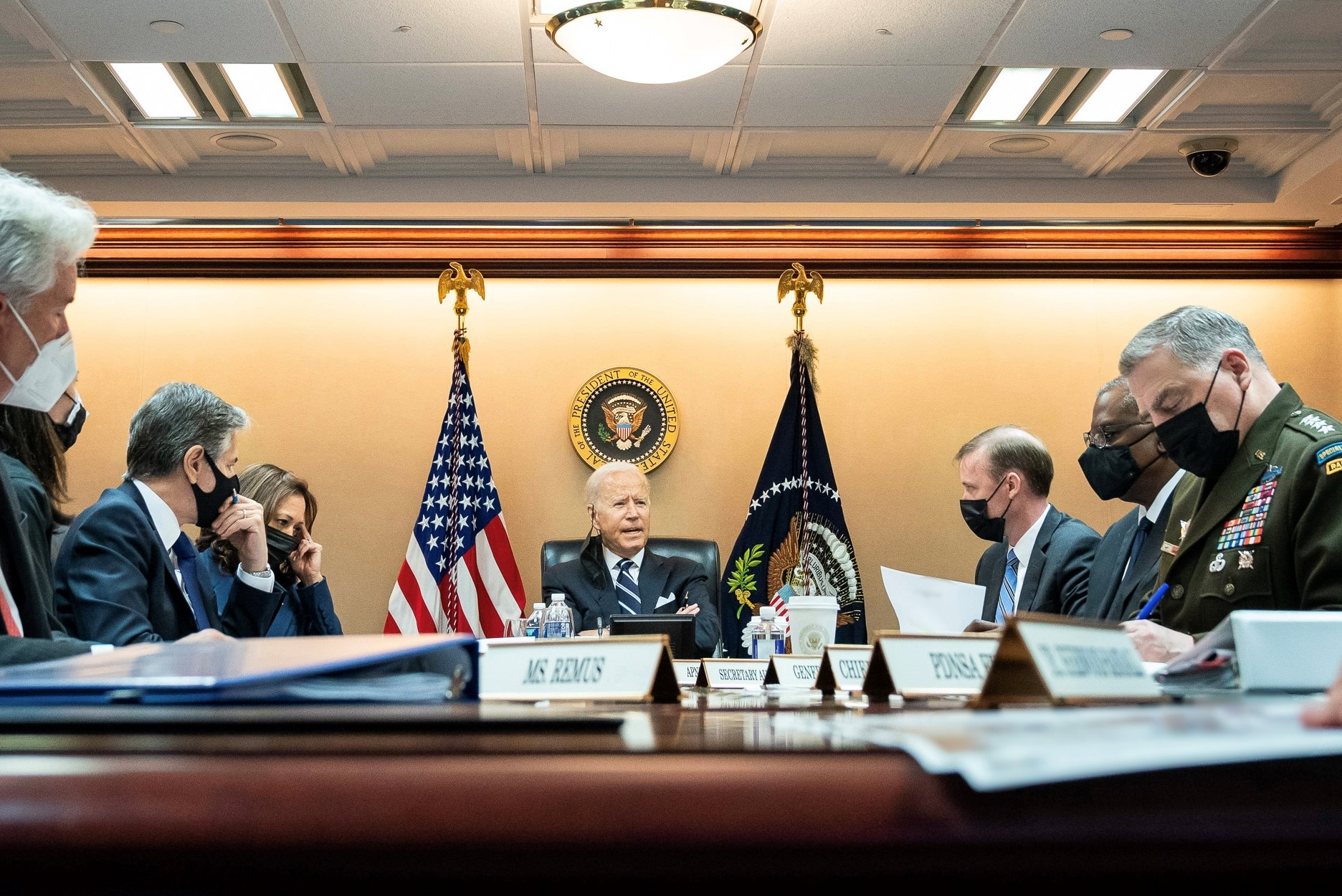
Sullivan sitting with President Joe Biden, Vice President Kamala Harris, and the U.S. national security team, August 18, 2021

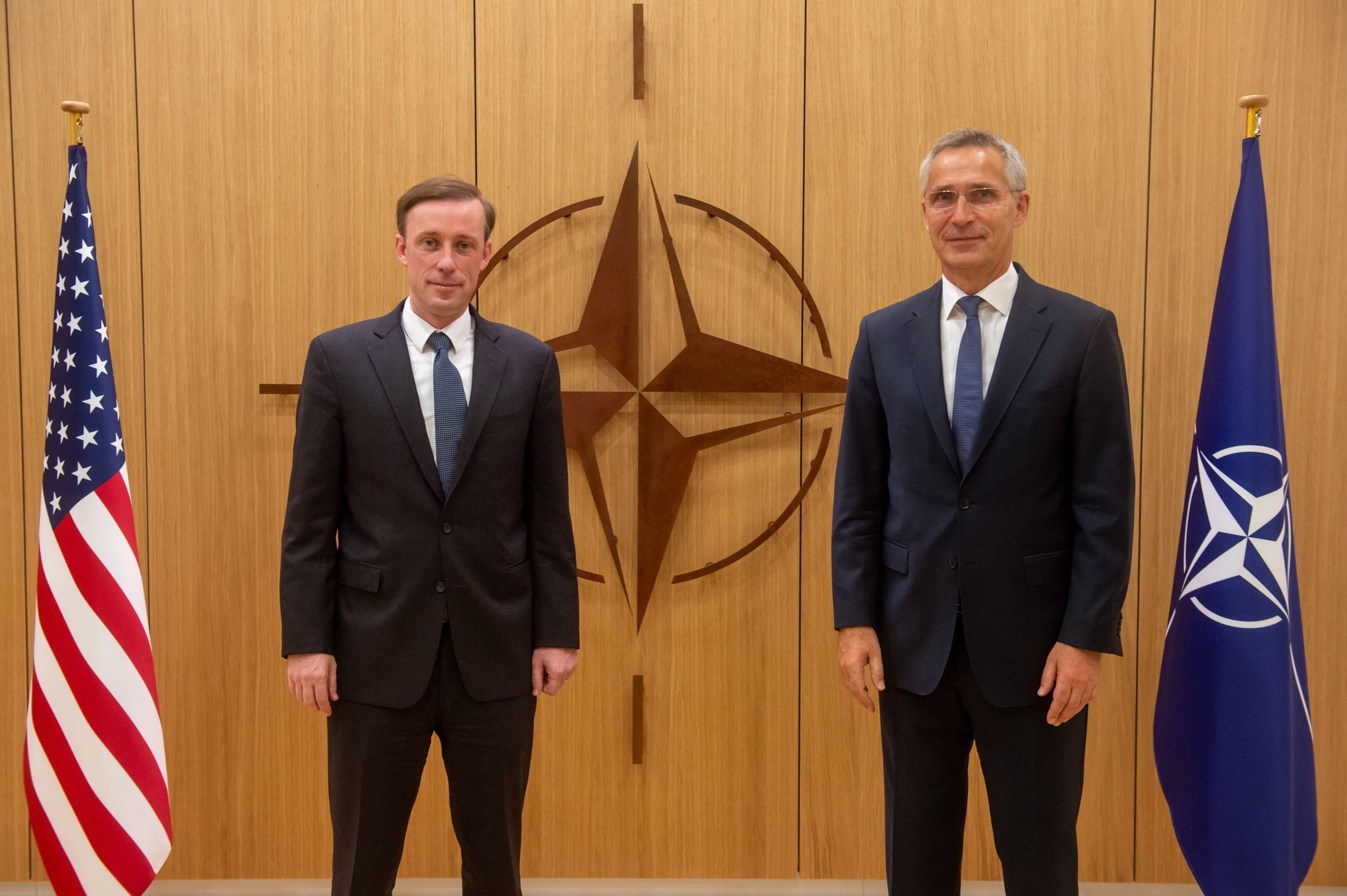
Sullivan with NATO Secretary General Jens Stoltenberg in Brussels, October 7, 2021

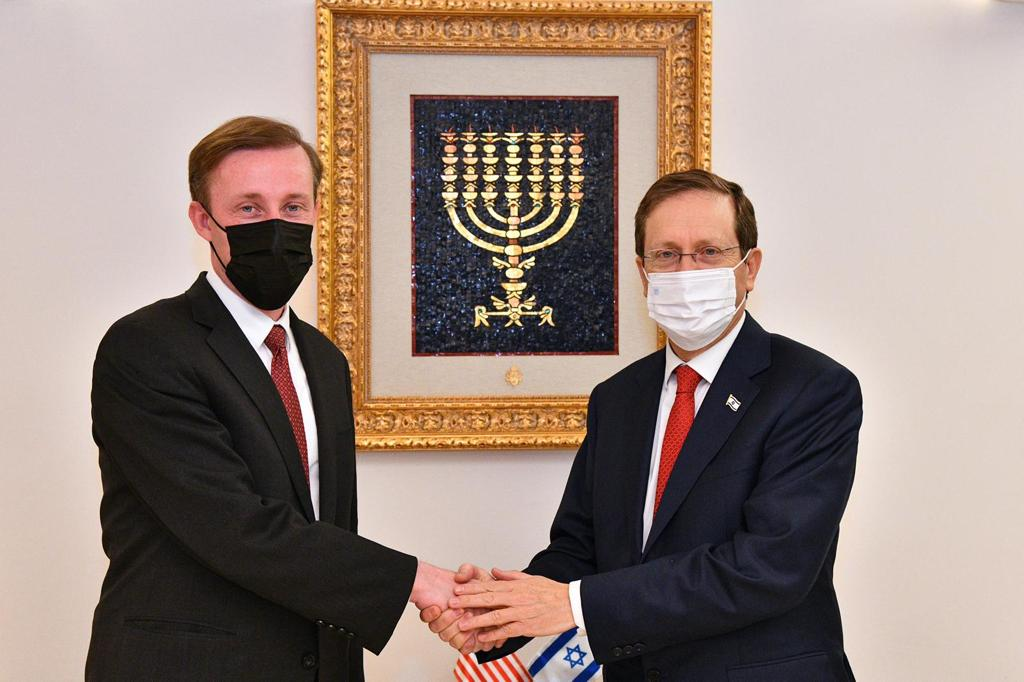
Sullivan with Israel's president Isaac Herzog, December 22, 2021

=== 2021 ===
On November 22, 2020, Sullivan was announced as Joe Biden's National Security Advisor. Upon his appointment, Sullivan stated that the early priorities of Biden's National Security Council (NSC) are the COVID-19 pandemic, "restructuring the NSC to make public health a permanent national security priority", and China relations. He also emphasized that the Biden administration aimed to repair American relations with allies that he regarded as being damaged during the Trump administration.

In September 2021 The Guardian opined that one of Sullivan's themes in the job is connecting US actions on the world stage to the lives and welfare of ordinary Americans, with the mantra of "a foreign policy for the middle class".

After the surrender of Kabul to the Taliban, Sullivan said that the collapse of the government of Afghanistan occurred because at the "end of the day, despite the fact we spent 20 years and tens of billions of dollars to give the best equipment, the best training and the best capacity to the Afghan national security forces, we could not give them the will and they ultimately decided that they would not fight for Kabul and they would not fight for the country." However, Brett Bruen, director of global engagement in the Obama White House, called for Sullivan's dismissal over his role in the affair.

On September 28, 2021, Sullivan met in Saudi Arabia with Saudi Crown Prince Mohammed bin Salman to discuss the 2021 global energy crisis and Saudi Arabian-led intervention in Yemen. They also discussed the potential deal to normalize relations between Israel and Saudi Arabia.

On October 6, 2021, a high level meeting between Sullivan and top Chinese diplomat, CCP Politburo member & director of the Office of the Central Foreign Affairs Commission Yang Jiechi, in Zürich, Switzerland focused on a number of contentious aspects of Chinese-American relations, including the existence of Taiwan, trade disputes, the COVID-19 origin theories, as well as civic freedoms in Hong Kong. Despite continued differences between the two nations on these issues, both sides agreed to continue their cooperation "in the spirit of fair and peaceful competition".

On October 25, 2021, Sullivan was briefed by Pentagon officials on the full range of military options to ensure that Iran would not be able to produce a nuclear weapon.

On November 7, 2021, Sullivan stated that the US does not pursue system change in China any longer, marking a clear break from the China policy pursued by previous US administrations. Sullivan said that the US is not seeking a new Cold War with China, but is looking for a system of peaceful coexistence.

On December 7, 2021, Sullivan warned that Russia's Nord Stream 2 natural gas pipeline project will end in the event of a Russian invasion of Ukraine.

=== 2022 ===
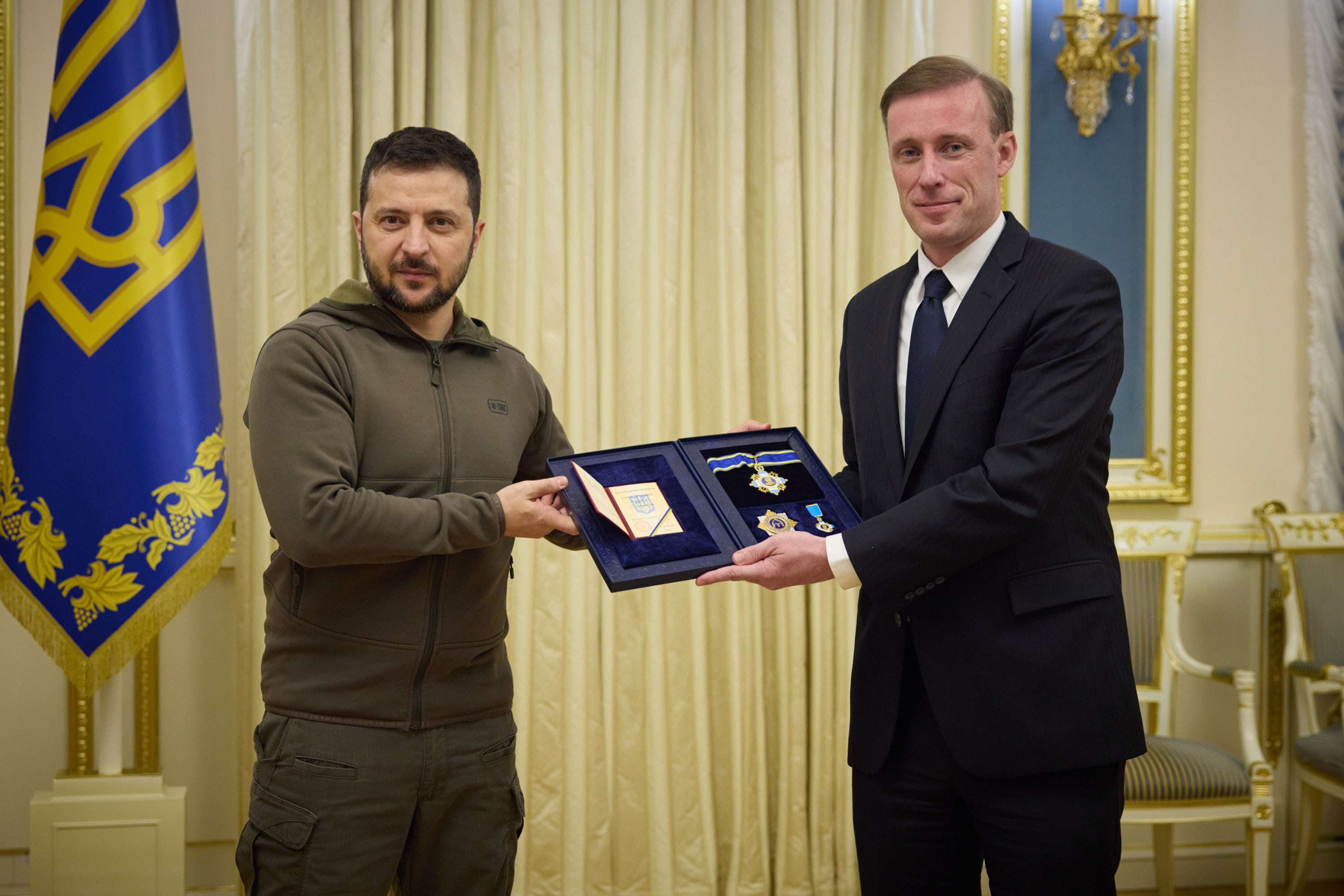
Sullivan with Ukrainian president Volodymyr Zelenskyy in Kyiv, November 4, 2022

On January 14, 2022, Sullivan accused Russia of sending saboteurs into Ukraine to stage "a false-flag operation" that would create a pretext for Russia to invade Ukraine. Russian foreign minister Sergey Lavrov dismissed the U.S. claim as "total disinformation."

On January 23, 2022, the Department of State authorized the voluntary departure of U.S. direct hire employees (USDH) and ordered the departure of eligible family members (EFM) from Embassy Kyiv due to the continued threat of Russian military action. The Department of State announced that U.S. citizens should not travel to Ukraine, and those in Ukraine should depart immediately using commercial or other privately available transportation options.

On February 11, 2022, the State Department issued a heightened threat Level 4 Do Not Travel Advisory in Ukraine.

Jake Sullivan warned of a high likelihood of escalation in the conflict as diplomatic options were failing in United Nations' Security Council. Sullivan suggested there is high likelihood of Russian invasion of Ukraine before the end of the 2022 Winter Olympics and there will be "no prospect of a U.S. military evacuation" once an invasion commences. He said that "Russia has all the forces it needs to conduct a major military action."

On February 24 the Russian invasion of Ukraine began.

On March 13, 2022, Sullivan warned of a full-fledged NATO response if Russia attacks any part of NATO territory. He reportedly advised Zelenskyy not to try to retake Crimea or attack the Crimean Bridge, fearing that Russia might respond with a nuclear strike. Sullivan also reportedly imposed restrictions to prevent Ukraine from using Western-supplied weapons for retaliatory attacks on Russian territory.

On March 14, 2022, he warned China that it would face consequences if it helped Russia evade sanctions.

=== 2023 ===
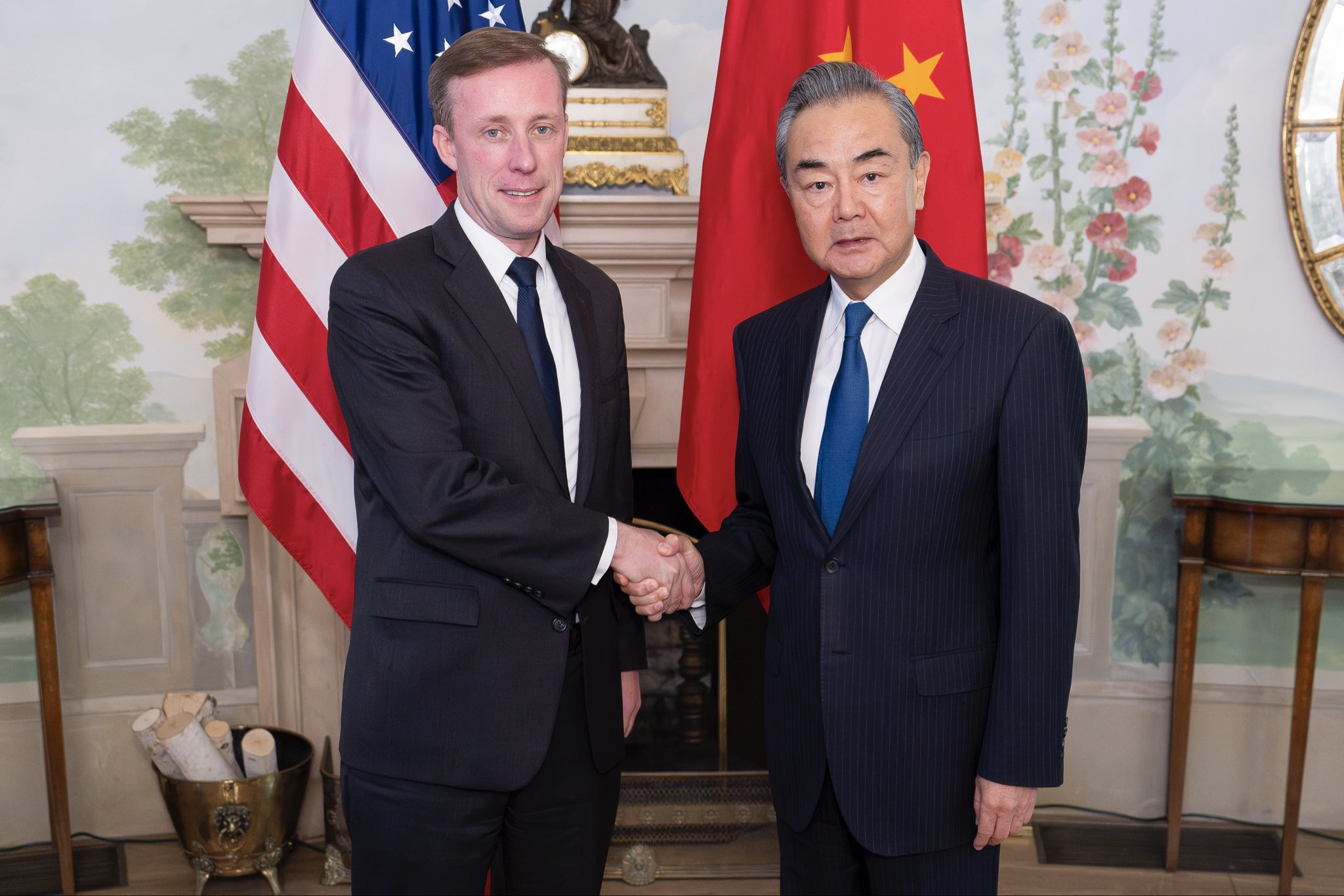
Sullivan with Chinese foreign chief Wang Yi, October 28, 2023

On July 6, 2023, President Joe Biden authorized the provision of cluster munitions in support of a Ukrainian counteroffensive against Russian forces in Russian-annexed southeastern Ukraine, bypassing U.S. law prohibiting the transfer of cluster munitions with a failure rate greater than one percent. Sullivan defended the use of cluster munitions, saying that "Ukraine would not be using these munitions in some foreign land. This is their country they're defending."

On October 2, 2023, Sullivan stated in an article in Foreign Affairs that the Biden administration had "de-escalated crises in Gaza" and shortly before noted the Middle East is "quieter today than it has been in two decades." Five days later, Hamas launched a large-scale attack on Israel from the Gaza Strip, sparking the Gaza war. The article was later edited for online release.

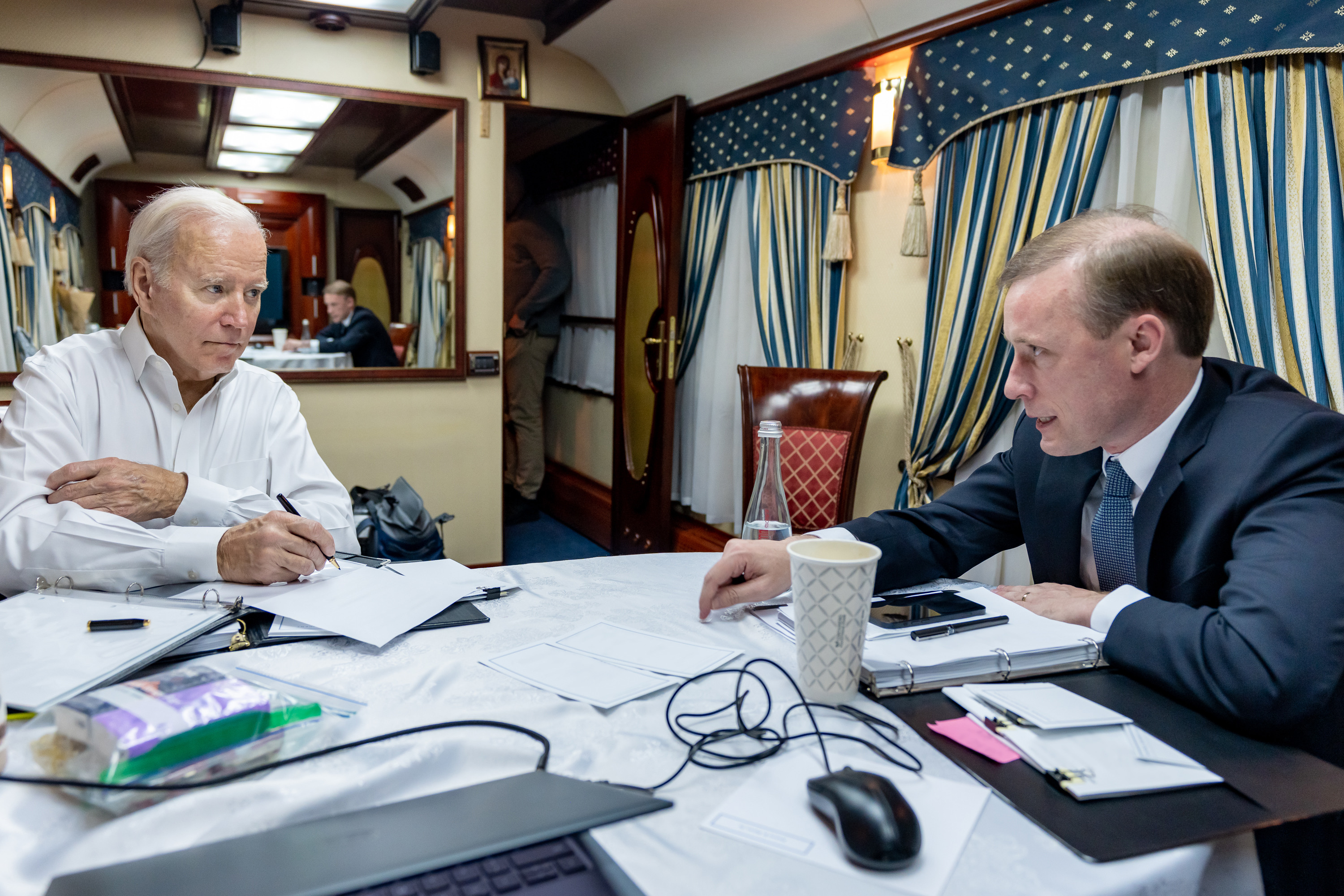
Sullivan with President Joe Biden, February 19, 2023

On October 15, 2023, CNN's Jake Tapper, in an interview with Sullivan, raised questions about Israel's blockade of the Gaza Strip and the impact on its population. Sullivan claimed that the United States worked with Israel "to make sure that innocent Palestinians get access to [water and medicine and food] and are protected from bombardment."

On October 29, 2023, Sullivan dismissed calls for a ceasefire in Israel's war against Hamas in the Gaza Strip, warning that any potential "humanitarian pause" to get hostages out of Gaza could benefit Hamas. He declined to comment on whether Israel had committed war crimes in Gaza and whether Gazans would be allowed to return to their homes. Sullivan stated that "Israel has a right, indeed a responsibility, to defend itself against a terrorist group."

In the November–December 2023 issue of Foreign Affairs Sullivan laid out his vision of "The Sources of American Power". It was the issue's cover story. Anders Åslund wrote that the article showed a "Biden administration in denial about Ukraine".

When informed that countries in the Global South, and South Africa in particular, were really concerned about the situation in Palestine because they could see echoes of their own experiences, Sullivan reportedly responded "Fuck Pretoria," still resentful that South Africa had not supported him when he led the US and NATO intervention in Libya over a decade prior.

In December 2023, when USAID Administrator Samantha Power and Ambassador to the UN Linda Thomas-Greenfield began privately expressing doubts about Biden's "bearhug policy" toward Netanyahu, Sullivan began boxing them out of Gaza-related meetings until they ceased their criticisms.

=== 2024 ===
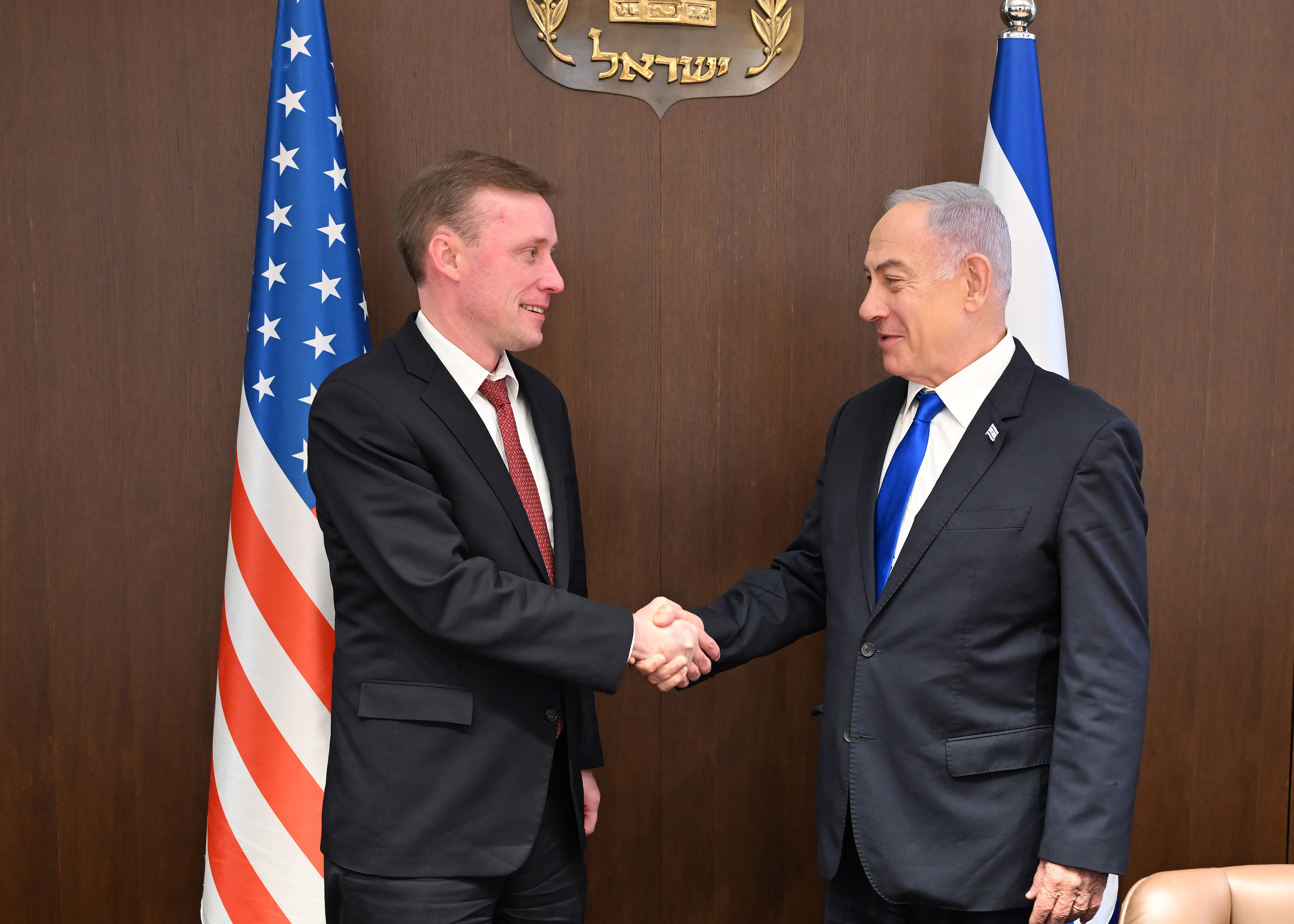
Sullivan with Israeli prime minister Benjamin Netanyahu in Israel, May 19, 2024

In January 2024, the Biden administration rejected Russian president Vladimir Putin's proposal for a ceasefire in Ukraine. Sullivan informed Putin's foreign policy adviser Yuri Ushakov that the United States would not discuss a ceasefire without Ukraine's participation.

Also in January 2024 Sullivan met with Director of the CCP Office of the Central Foreign Affairs Commission Wang Yi at Bangkok for two days.

In March 2024, Sullivan warned Ukrainian officials to cease military strikes in Russia using Ukraine's own weaponry, amidst concerns about impacts on oil prices. US officials had previously placed restrictions against Ukraine using US-provided weapons in Russia.

In May 2024, Sullivan expressed concern at the Irish, Norwegian, and Spanish recognition of Palestine and Israel's growing diplomatic isolation, saying that "we certainly have seen a growing chorus of voices, including voices that had previously been in support of Israel, drift in another direction. That is of concern to us because we do not believe that that contributes to Israel's long-term security or vitality."

On June 9, 2024, Sullivan said that the rescue operation to recover Israeli hostages from the Nuseirat refugee camp in central Gaza was aided by intelligence support from the United States.

On August 29, Sullivan met and conferred with General Secretary of the Chinese Communist Party Xi Jinping, at the Great Hall of the People in Beijing. He had been on a three-day trip. He had spoken (for the fifth time in their careers) to Director of the CCP Office of the Central Foreign Affairs Commission Wang Yi along with CCP Central Military Commission vice chairman General Zhang Youxia the previous day. Concerns were expressed over the Taiwan Strait and the South China Sea, and Sullivan made special reference to the November 2023 Woodside Summit. It was the first trip to Beijing in eight years by a US National Security Advisor.

In October 2024, in a speech at the Israeli Embassy on the first anniversary of the October 7 attacks, Sullivan celebrated the "enduring strategic gains" of the past year.

During the Biden administration Jake Sullivan along with others acted as an intermediary for Biden administration officials and lawmakers who sought access to the President according to an investigative report by the Wall Street Journal.

Alongside Brett McGurk, National Security Council coordinator for the Middle East, Sullivan allegedly cast doubt in private about whether images of starving children in Gaza were real, despite numerous international monitors warning of famine. Sullivan denied this.

=== 2025 ===
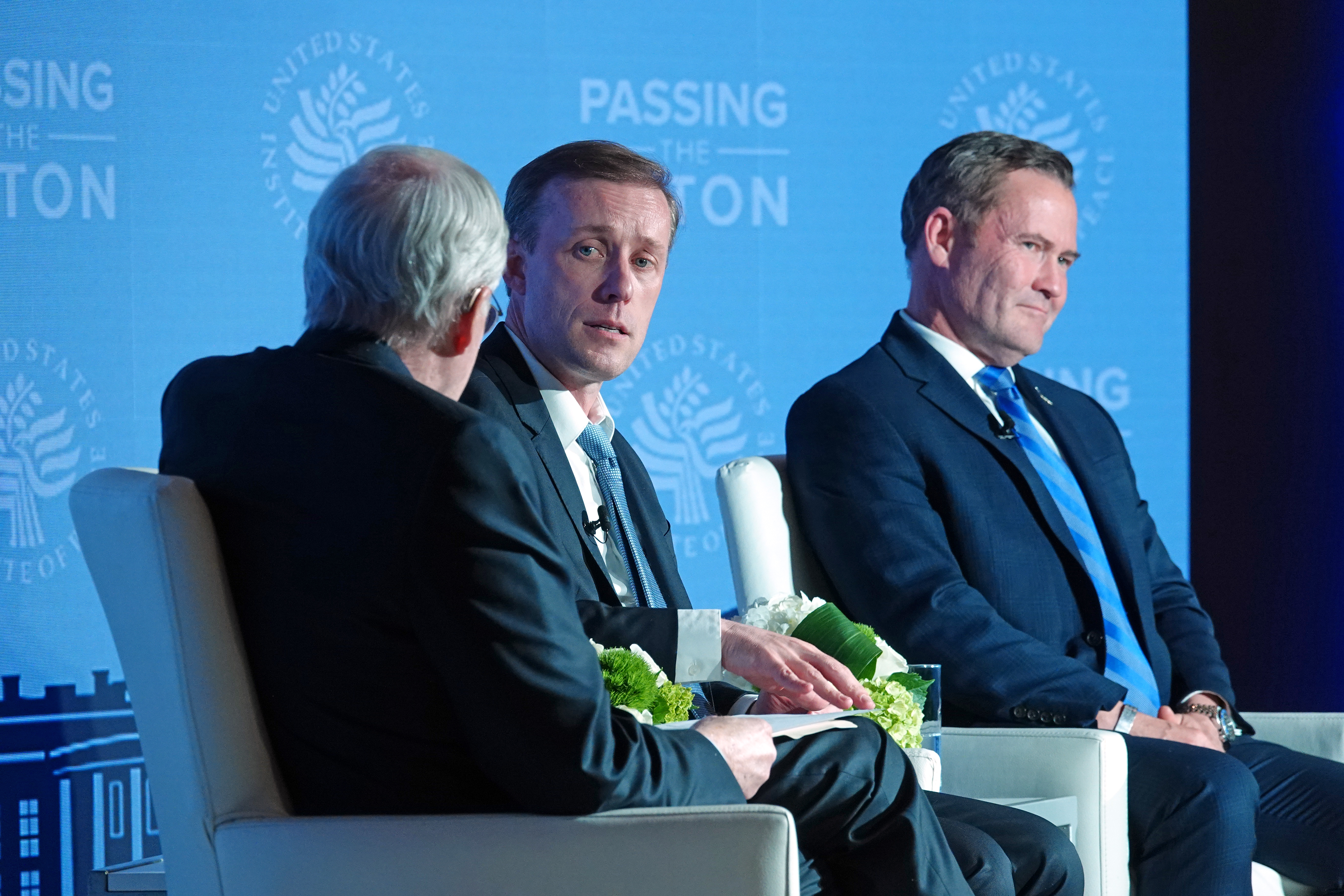
Sullivan, Mike Waltz and Stephen Hadley on January 14, 2025

In January 2025, three days before leaving his position as National Security Advisor, Sullivan warned that the next few years would be crucial in determining whether artificial intelligence leads to catastrophe and whether China or America prevails in the AI race.

On January 14, 2025, Sullivan said that the shortage of personnel in the Armed Forces of Ukraine remains an acute problem, and recommended that Ukraine step up mobilization.

== Post-National Security Advisor career ==
On February 8, 2025, President Donald Trump revoked Sulllivan's security clearance. Sullivan joined the faculty of the Harvard Kennedy School on April 1, 2025, as the inaugural Kissinger Professor of the Practice of Statecraft and World Order. In 2025, Sullivan called publicly for an arms embargo on Israel in order to bring an end to the war in the Gaza Strip.

In September 2025, responding to Trump's 50% tariff on India, Sullivan accused President Donald Trump of sidelining bilateral relations between the US and India because of his family's business ties in Pakistan. Citing Trump's backing of the crypto platform World Liberty Financial and its agreements with the Pakistan Crypto Council, Sullivan called the shift a "huge strategic harm" that undermines long-standing U.S. partnerships and global trust.

In November 2025, Sullivan and Jon Finer launched The Long Game, a weekly podcast in which they analyze current news and present U.S. policy choices from their perspectives as former White House National Security Advisor and Deputy National Security Advisor, respectively.

In March 2026, after Senator Lindsey Graham succeeded in convincing President Trump to start the war with Iran, he called Sullivan to celebrate and discuss the war efforts.

In November 2026, Jake Sullivan, former US National Security Adviser, spoke at the Massachusetts Institute of Technology (MIT). A group of student protesters attended the event and disrupted his remarks. They criticized his role in shaping the Biden administration's policy toward Gaza and called him the "architect of genocide." Some chanted "Thousands are dead because of your lies," interrupting the event.

== Personal life ==
Sullivan is married to Maggie Goodlander, who has represented New Hampshire's 2nd congressional district in the U.S. House of Representatives since 2025. A Yale graduate, Goodlander is a former intelligence officer in the United States Navy Reserve who served as a foreign policy advisor to Senators Joe Lieberman and John McCain and as a law clerk to then-Chief Judge Merrick Garland of the United States Court of Appeals for the District of Columbia Circuit and Associate Justice Stephen Breyer of the United States Supreme Court. They married in 2015 and live in Nashua, New Hampshire, with homes in Washington, D.C., and Portsmouth, New Hampshire.

In April 2023, an unknown intoxicated man reportedly entered Sullivan's home in the West End neighborhood of Washington D.C. at around 3 am, but left before Secret Service agents were alerted. Sullivan discovered the man because he was still working at the time.

== Honors and awards ==
=== International honors ===
- Sweden:
  - Commander Grand Cross of the Order of the Polar Star (2024)

== Publications ==
=== Articles ===
- Geopolitics in the Age of Artificial Intelligence, Foreign Affairs, January 2026
- The Sources of American Power, Foreign Affairs, October 2023
- America's Opportunity in the Middle East, Foreign Affairs, May 22, 2020 (co-authored with Daniel Benaim)
- The Case for a National Security Budget, Foreign Affairs, November 19, 2019 (co-authored with Brett Rosenberg)
- Competition Without Catastrophe, Foreign Affairs, August 1, 2019 (co-authored with Kurt M. Campbell)
- The New Old Democrats, Democracy, June 20, 2018

== See also ==
- Foreign policy of the Biden administration
- List of law clerks for the second seat of the Supreme Court of the United States

Political offices
Preceded by Robert C. O'Brien	National Security Advisor; 2021–2025	Succeeded by Mike Waltz
