= Deputy National Security Advisor =

Executive position in the United States of America

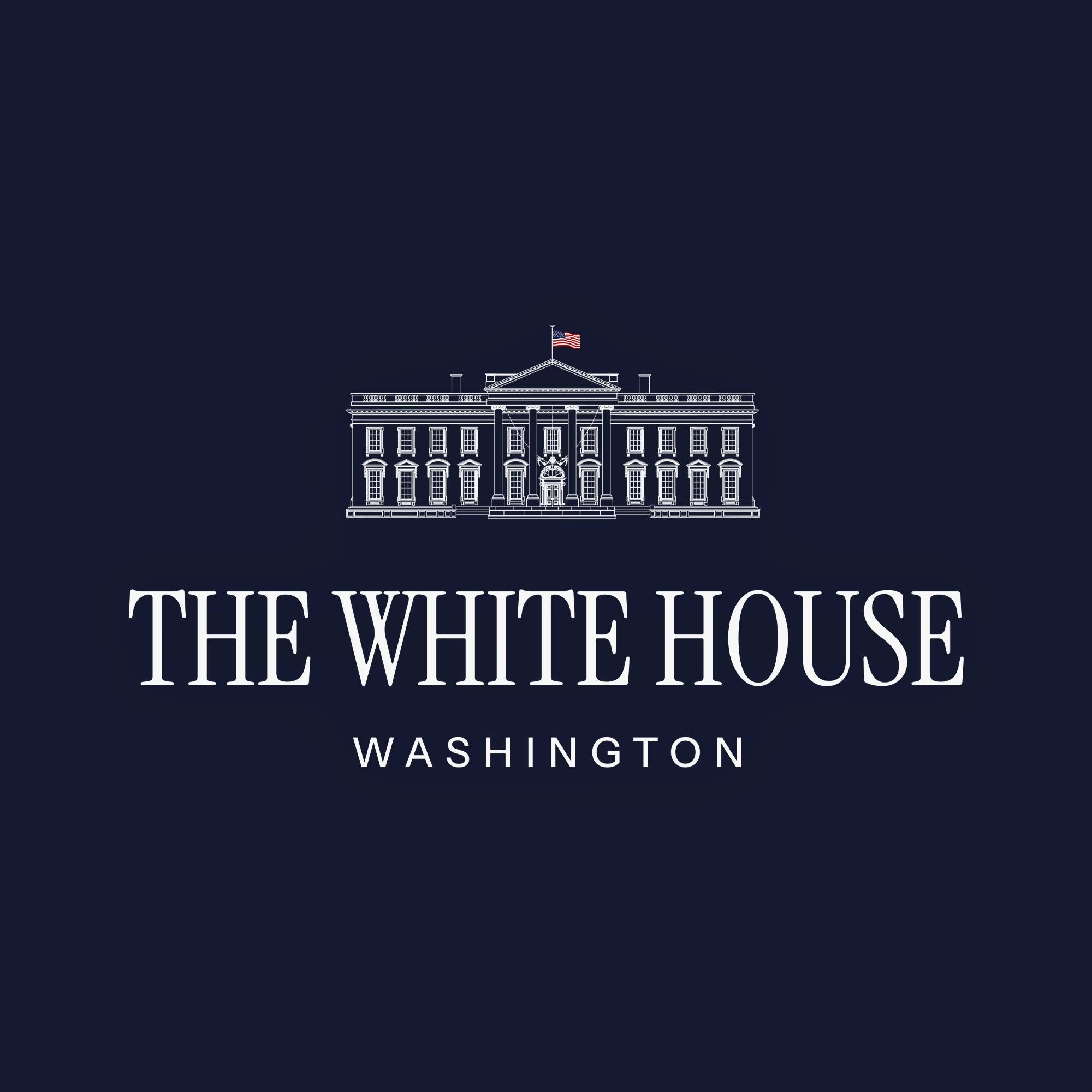

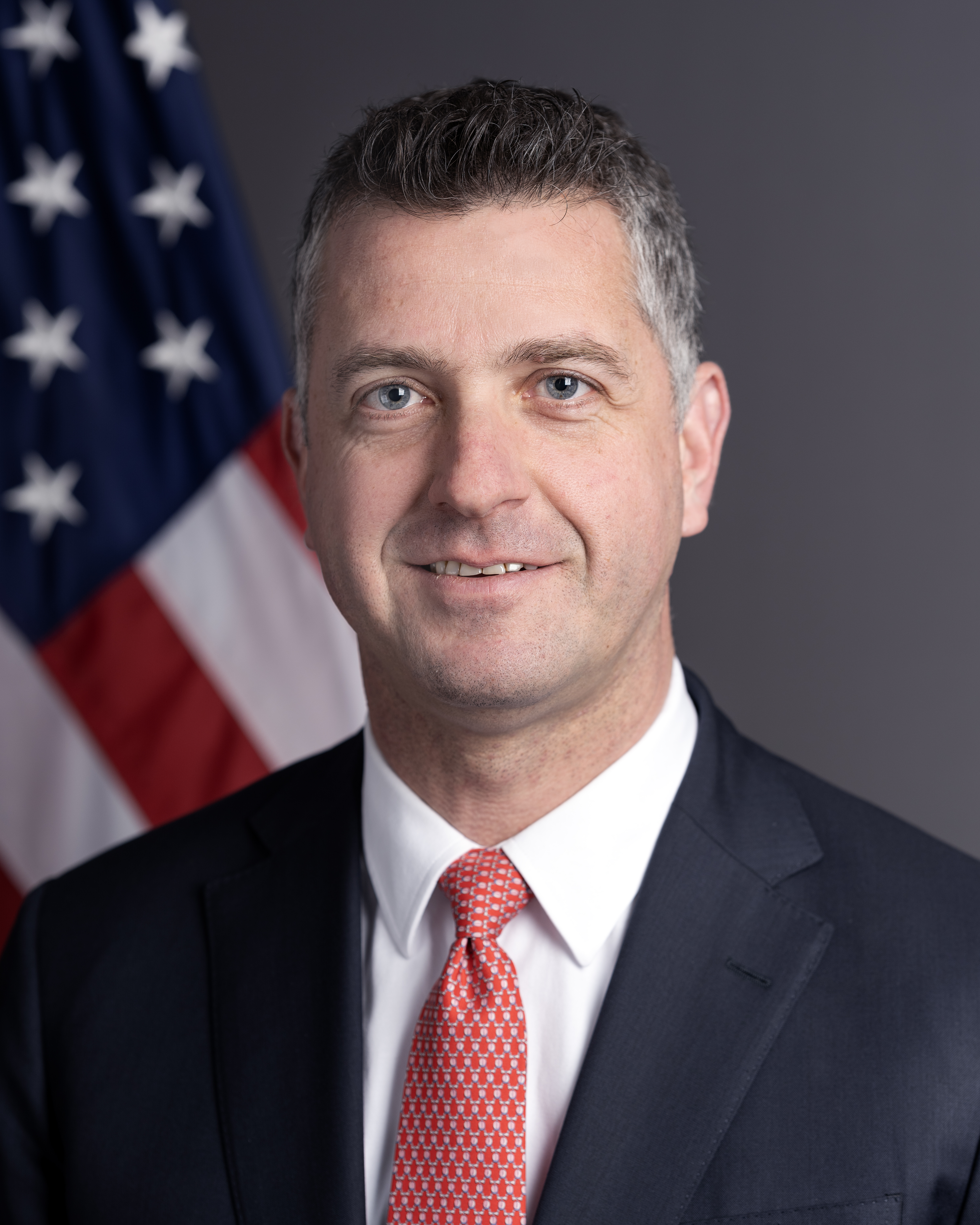
- Incumbent; Michael Needham since May 26, 2026
- Executive Office of the President
- Member of: National Security Council; Homeland Security Council
- Reports to: President of the United States; United States National Security Advisor
- Appointer: President of the United States
- Constituting instrument: National Security Presidential Memorandum
- Formation: 1961
- First holder: Walt Rostow
- Website: wh.gov/nsc

The United States deputy national security advisor is a member of the Executive Office of the President of the United States and the United States National Security Council, serving under the president's national security advisor.

Among other responsibilities, the deputy national security advisor often serves as Executive Secretary to the National Security Council Principals Committee, and as chairman of the National Security Council Deputies Committee. The role changes according to the organizational philosophy and staffing of each White House and there are often multiple deputies to the national security advisor charged with various areas of focus.

== List of principal deputies ==
Name	Start	End	President(s)
Walt Rostow	January 20, 1961	December 4, 1961	John F. Kennedy (1961–1963)
Carl Kaysen	1961	1963	John F. Kennedy (1961–1963)
Bob Komer	1965	1965	Lyndon Johnson (1963–1969)
Francis Bator	October 1965	September 1967	Lyndon Johnson (1963–1969)
Richard Allen	January 20, 1969	1969	Richard Nixon (1969–1974)
Al Haig	June 1970	January 4, 1973	Richard Nixon (1969–1974)
Brent Scowcroft	January 4, 1973	November 3, 1975	Richard Nixon (1969–1974)
Brent Scowcroft	January 4, 1973	November 3, 1975	Gerald Ford (1974–1977)
William Hyland	November 3, 1975	January 20, 1977	Gerald Ford (1974–1977)
David Aaron	January 20, 1977	January 20, 1981	Jimmy Carter (1977–1981)
Bud Nance	January 20, 1981	January 20, 1982	Ronald Reagan (1981–1989)
Bud McFarlane	April 4, 1982	October 17, 1983	Ronald Reagan (1981–1989)
John Poindexter	October 17, 1983	December 4, 1985	Ronald Reagan (1981–1989)
Don Fortier	December 10, 1985	March 1986	Ronald Reagan (1981–1989)
Peter Rodman	March 1986	December 1986	Ronald Reagan (1981–1989)
Colin Powell	December 2, 1986	November 23, 1987	Ronald Reagan (1981–1989)
John Negroponte	November 23, 1987	January 20, 1989	Ronald Reagan (1981–1989)
Bob Gates	March 20, 1989	November 6, 1991	George H. W. Bush (1989–1993)
Jonathan Howe	November 7, 1991	January 19, 1993	George H. W. Bush (1989–1993)
Sandy Berger	January 20, 1993	March 14, 1997	Bill Clinton (1993–2001)
Jim Steinberg	December 23, 1996	August 1, 2000	Bill Clinton (1993–2001)
Steve Hadley	January 20, 2001	January 26, 2005	George W. Bush (2001–2009)
Jack Crouch	January 31, 2005	May 4, 2007	George W. Bush (2001–2009)
Jim Jeffrey	August 1, 2007	December 3, 2008	George W. Bush (2001–2009)
Tom Donilon	January 20, 2009	October 8, 2010	Barack Obama (2009–2017)
Denis McDonough	October 20, 2010	January 20, 2013	Barack Obama (2009–2017)
Tony Blinken	January 20, 2013	January 9, 2015	Barack Obama (2009–2017)
Avril Haines	January 11, 2015	January 20, 2017	Barack Obama (2009–2017)
K. T. McFarland	January 20, 2017	May 19, 2017	Donald Trump (2017–2021)
Ricky Waddell	May 19, 2017	May 15, 2018	Donald Trump (2017–2021)
Mira Ricardel	May 15, 2018	November 14, 2018	Donald Trump (2017–2021)
Charlie Kupperman	January 11, 2019	September 22, 2019	Donald Trump (2017–2021)
Matt Pottinger	September 22, 2019	January 7, 2021	Donald Trump (2017–2021)
Jon Finer	January 20, 2021	January 20, 2025	Joe Biden (2021–2025)
Alex Wong	January 20, 2025	May 1, 2025	Donald Trump (2025–present)
Robert Gabriel	May 23, 2025	May 20, 2026	Donald Trump (2025–present)
Mike Needham	May 26, 2026	present	Donald Trump (2025–present)

== List of additional deputies ==
Aside from the principal deputy, since the September 11 attacks, there have been some cases of other deputy-level positions with a specific portfolio. These include:

George W. Bush (2001–2009)

- Wayne A. Downing (2001–2002) for Combatting Terrorism
- Gary R. Edson (2001–2004) for International Economic Affairs
- Dr. David McCormick (2006–2007) for International Economic Affairs
- Michele Davis (2005–2006) for Strategic Communications
- Corry Schiermeyer (2006–2007) for Strategic Communications
- Mark Pfeifle (2007–2009) for Strategic Communications
- Juan Zarate (2005–2009) for Combating Terrorism
- Elliott Abrams (2005–2009) for Global Democracy Strategy

Barack Obama (2009–2017)

- John O. Brennan (2009–2013) for Homeland Security
- Ben Rhodes (2009–2017) for Strategic Communications
- Caroline Atkinson (2011-2015) for International Economic Affairs
- Lisa Monaco (2013–2017) for Homeland Security
- Wally Adeyemo (2015–2016) for International Economics

Donald Trump (2017–2021)

- Dina Powell (2017–2018) for Strategy
- Michael Anton (2017–2018) for Strategic Communications
- Nadia Schadlow (2018) for Strategy
- Victoria Coates (2019–2020) for Middle East and North African Affairs

Joe Biden (2021–2025)

- Elizabeth Sherwood-Randall (2021–2025) for Homeland Security and Counterterrorism
- Anne Neuberger (2021–2025) for Cyber and Emerging Technology
- Daleep Singh (2021–2022) for International Economics
- Mike Pyle (2022–2024) for International Economics
- Daleep Singh (2024–2025) for International Economics

Donald Trump (2025–present)

- Andy Baker (2025–present) for the Vice President
