= Michael Needham (political advisor) =

American political advisor (born 1981)

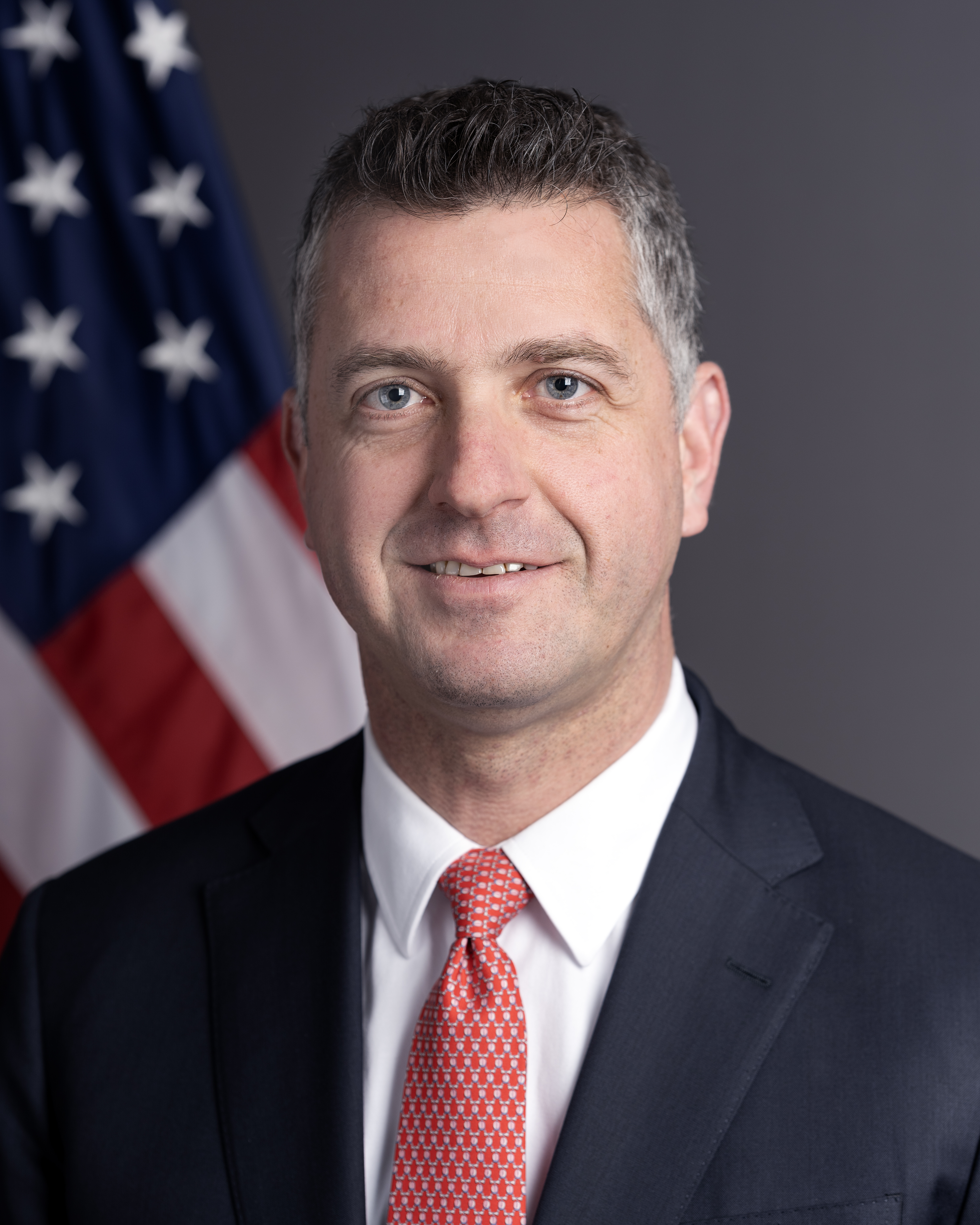
- Official portrait, 2025

United States Deputy National Security Advisor
- Incumbent
- Assumed office May 26, 2026 Serving with Andy Baker
- President: Donald Trump
- Preceded by: Robert Gabriel Jr.

34th Director of Policy Planning
- In office September 15, 2025 – May 26, 2026
- President: Donald Trump
- Preceded by: Michael Anton
- Succeeded by: Jeremy Lewin

37th Counselor of the United States Department of State
- In office January 20, 2025 – May 26, 2026
- President: Donald Trump
- Preceded by: Tom Sullivan
- Succeeded by: Daniel Holler

Chief of Staff to the Secretary of State
- In office January 20, 2025 – September 15, 2025
- President: Donald Trump
- Deputy: Daniel Holler
- Preceded by: Suzy George
- Succeeded by: Daniel Holler

Personal details
- Born: Michael Austin Needham; December 22, 1981 (age 44) New York City, New York, U.S.
- Spouse: Rachel Holt (m. 2012)
- Education: Williams College (BA); Stanford University (MBA)

Michael Austin Needham (born December 22, 1981) is an American political advisor who has served as the United States deputy national security advisor alongside Andy Baker since May 2026. Needham served as the director of policy planning from September 2025 to May 2026, as the counselor of the Department of State from January 2025 to May 2026, and as the chief of staff to the secretary of state from January to September 2025.

Needham graduated from Williams College in 2004. He worked for the Heritage Foundation after graduating and later became the chief of staff to the foundation's president, Edwin Feulner. Needham assisted in Rudy Giuliani's 2008 presidential campaign. After Giuliani ended his campaign, Needham enrolled in the Stanford Graduate School of Business. Needham helped establish Heritage Action for America alongside Russell Vought and served as its chief executive for eight years. In April 2018, Needham became the chief of staff to Florida senator Marco Rubio. He resigned in June 2023 to establish a policy institute. The following month, Needham became the chair of Oren Cass's American Compass.

In December 2024, President-elect Donald Trump named Needham as the counselor of the Department of State. He additionally served as the chief of staff to Rubio, who became the secretary of state. At the Department of State, Needham was among several powerful officials, particularly after Rubio became the acting national security advisor in May 2025. In September, Needham became the director of policy planning, succeeding Michael Anton. In May 2026, he was named as deputy national security advisor, succeeding Robert Gabriel Jr.

== Early life and education (1981–2010) ==
Michael Austin Needham was born on December 22, 1981, in Manhattan. Needham is the son of Ellen and George Needham. Ellen was the vice president of women's sportswear at Saks Fifth Avenue, while George is the chairman and chief executive of the Needham Group, an investment firm. He was raised in the Upper East Side. Needham attended Collegiate School. He graduated from Williams College with a bachelor's degree in political science. After Rudy Giuliani ended his 2008 presidential campaign, Needham enrolled in the Stanford Graduate School of Business. At Stanford, he met Rachel Holt; they married in 2012. Needham is a Claremont Fellow.

== Career ==
=== Early political work (2004–2010) ===
After Needham graduated from Williams College in 2004, Bill Simon, the Republican candidate in the 2002 California gubernatorial election, secured Needham a position at the Heritage Foundation. He worked within the foundation's Kathryn and Shelby Cullom Davis Institute for International Studies. Within six months, Needham had been hired as the chief of staff to Edwin Feulner, the Heritage Foundation's president. In 2007, Needham joined Rudy Giuliani's 2008 presidential campaign, resigning as Feulner's chief of staff.

=== Heritage Action (2010–2018) ===
Following the passage of the Affordable Care Act in March 2010, Needham and Russell Vought established Heritage Action for America. Needham became its chief executive the following month. At Heritage Action, Needham aggressively pursued brinksmanship. His strategy involved identifying critical votes and pressuring lawmakers, including through the use of a public scorecard. In 2013, The New Republic noted that Needham had established a "grassroots army" to ensure that congressional Republicans would vote according to Heritage Action's priorities. He was noted for being ideologically steadfast; Needham's hardline and uncompromising approach was criticized by some establishment Republicans and caused conflict within the Heritage Foundation. According to The New Republic, Needham devised much of Heritage Action's efforts to defund the Affordable Care Act. Needham was a key operative in advocating for Republicans to force a government shutdown over the Affordable Care Act in 2013. Although the organization failed to achieve some of its objectives, The Washington Post described Needham as having a "profound impact on how business is conducted in Washington."

=== Further political work (2018–2024) ===
In April 2018, Florida senator Marco Rubio hired Needham as his chief of staff. Florida Politics said the move was an effort to bolster Rubio's standing within the conservative movement. In June 2023, Needham resigned to establish America 2100, a conservative and populist policy institute. By July, Needham had become a member of the advisory board for Oren Cass's American Compass, and that same month, American Compass announced Needham had been appointed as its chair.

== United States Department of State (2025–2026) ==
Needham was among several individuals who led Donald Trump's second presidential transition for the Department of State. In December 2024, Trump named Needham as the department's counselor. He later served as chief of staff to Secretary of State Marco Rubio. In September, Rubio appointed Needham to succeed Michael Anton as the director of policy planning after his resignation and named Daniel Holler, Rubio's deputy chief of staff, as new chief of staff.

Needham was among the most powerful officials at the department early in Trump's second term. Politico described Needham as the "implementer-in-chief" of Trump's foreign policy. Needham and Anton helped clear a stop-work order temporarily halting foreign aid and requested edits to the department's annual Country Report on Human Rights Practices, delaying the report. Needham was the point of contact for the Department of State on the United States's attacks in Yemen, according to a Signal group chat that was leaked by the journalist Jeffrey Goldberg in March 2025.

After Rubio became acting national security advisor in May 2025, Needham assumed additional responsibility in operating the Department of State. Politico's Nahal Toosi later reported that Needham had become Rubio's "stand-in" at the department by March 2026, though a spokesperson for the Department of State rejected that assertion. According to Politico, he blocked Anton's efforts to resign amid a dispute with Trump's foreign policy. Needham oversaw layoffs at the Department of State. He assumed control of negotiations between the United States and Greenland and was involved in talks over a ceasefire to end the 2026 Lebanon war.

== Deputy national security advisor (2026–present) ==
In May 2026, Axios reported that Needham had become a deputy national security advisor alongside Andy Baker, succeeding Robert Gabriel Jr.

== Views ==
After Donald Trump insulted Arizona senator John McCain's experience as a prisoner of war, Needham called Trump a "clown" and stated that he should end his presidential campaign in the 2016 presidential election. He supported Ted Cruz in the 2016 election. Needham later told The Washington Post that Trump presented an "opportunity" for Heritage Action to affect his policies and that his candidacy was "complete vindication that Washington needs to change". In Trump's first presidency, Needham praised Trump's tax policy and hardline strategy towards China. In July 2025, Needham told an industrial conference in Detroit that the United States needed to reconstruct its industrial base to counter Russia's access to raw materials and China's manufacturing sector.
