= Lawrence Wilkerson =

Chief of Staff to Colin Powell

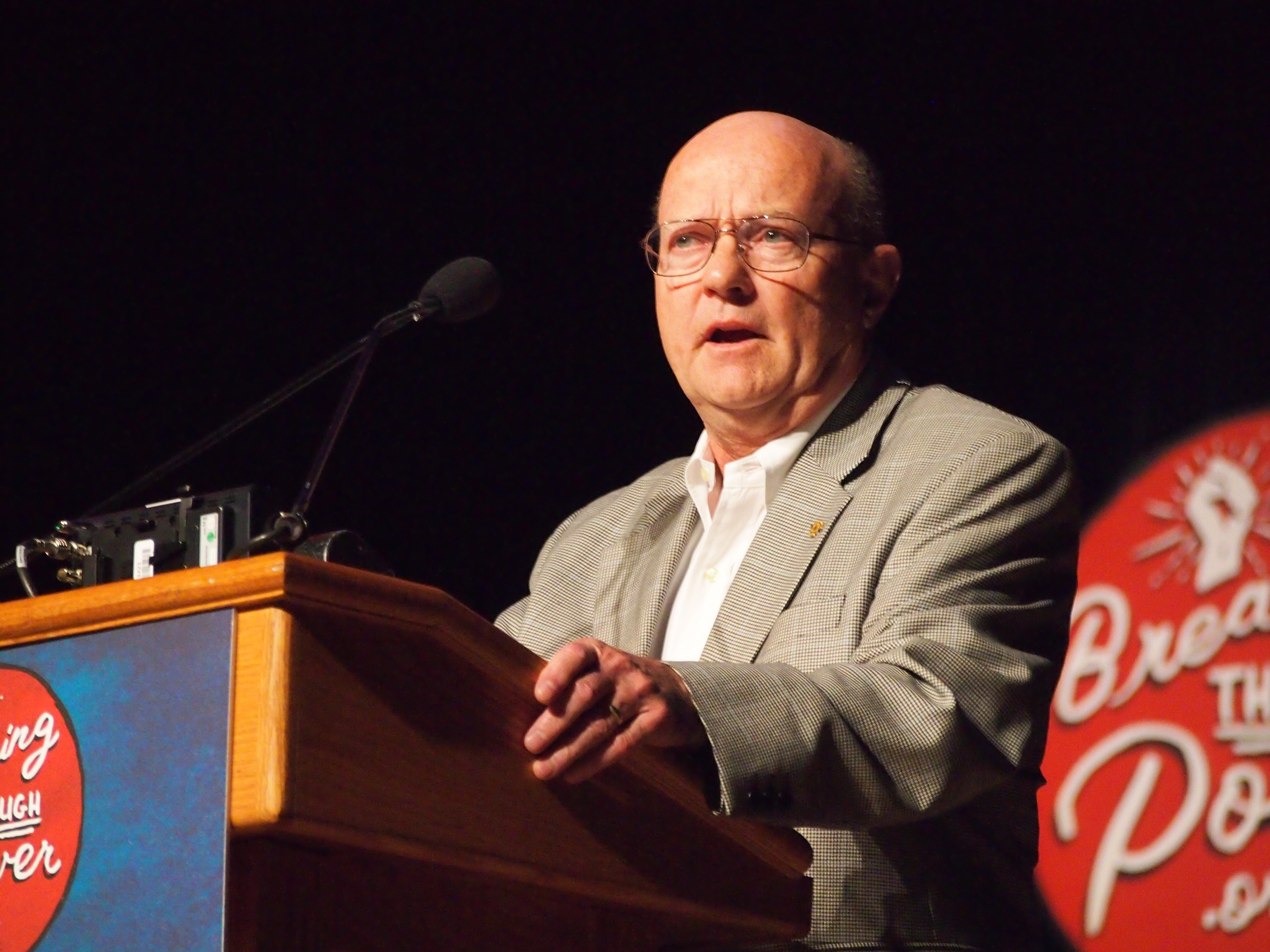
- Wilkerson in 2016

Chief of Staff to the United States Secretary of State
- In office 2002 – January 2005
- Secretary: Colin Powell
- Succeeded by: Brian Gunderson

Personal details
- Born: June 15, 1945 (age 81) Gaffney, South Carolina, U.S.
- Party: Republican
- Spouse: Barbara Ann Wilkerson (m. 1966; died 2021)
- Children: 2
- Occupation: Defense analyst

Military service
- Allegiance: United States of America
- Branch/service: United States Army
- Years of service: 1966–1997
- Rank: Colonel
- Battles/wars: Vietnam War

Lawrence B. Wilkerson (born June 15, 1945) is a retired United States Army Colonel and former chief of staff to United States Secretary of State Colin Powell.

Since the end of his military career, Wilkerson has criticized many aspects of the Iraq War, including his own preparation of Powell's presentation to the United Nations Security Council, as well as other aspects of American policy in the Middle East, as well as criticizing Israel. As of 2024, he is a member of Veteran Intelligence Professionals for Sanity.

== Education and early military service ==
Wilkerson was born in Gaffney, South Carolina.

After three years of studying philosophy and English literature at Bucknell University, Wilkerson dropped out in 1966 and volunteered to serve in the Vietnam War. He told The Washington Post: "I felt an obligation because my dad had fought, and I thought that was kind of your duty."

Wilkerson arrived as an Army officer piloting an OH-6A Cayuse observation helicopter and logged about 1100 combat hours over a year. He flew low and slow through South Vietnam, and was involved in one incident in which he says he prevented an atrocity by purposely placing his helicopter between a position that was full of civilians, and another helicopter that wanted to launch an attack on the position. He also had many vocal disagreements with his superiors and his own gunner crew over free-fire zones, including an incident in which one of his crew shot a wagon that wound up having a little girl inside it. He went on to Airborne School and Ranger School before receiving his Bachelor of Arts degree in English literature and graduate degrees in international relations and national security.

He attended the Naval War College in Newport, Rhode Island, and later returned there to teach. He later served as deputy director of the Marine Corps War College at Quantico.

Wilkerson was executive Assistant to Admiral Stewart A. Ring, United States Navy Pacific Command and Director of the United States Marine Corps War College.

== Assistant to Colin Powell ==
Wilkerson spent some years in the United States Navy's Pacific Command in South Korea, Japan and Hawaii, where he was well regarded by his superiors. These recommendations led in early 1989 to a successful interview to become the assistant to Colin Powell, through 1993. Powell was then finishing his stint as National Security Advisor in the Reagan administration and moving to a position in the United States Army Forces Command at Fort McPherson.

Wilkerson also had a stint as staff member to Richard Haass of the Council on Foreign Relations.

Wilkerson continued his supporting role to Powell when the latter became Chairman of the Joint Chiefs of Staff through the Gulf War, following Powell into civilian life and then back into public service when President George W. Bush appointed Powell Secretary of State.

Wilkerson was responsible for the review of information from the Central Intelligence Agency used to prepare Powell for his February 2003 presentation to the United Nations Security Council. His failure to realize that the evidence was faulty has been attributed to the limited time (only one week) that he had to review the data. The subsequent developments led Wilkerson to become disillusioned: "Combine the detainee abuse issue with the ineptitude of post-invasion planning for Iraq, wrap both in this blanket of secretive decision-making...and you get the overall reason for my speaking out."

== Later career ==
Wilkerson has worked as a Distinguished Adjunct Professor of Government and Public Policy at the College of William & Mary since January 2006, and taught national security affairs in the Honors Program at George Washington University from January 2006 until December 2011.

As of 2014, he served on the advisory board of the Military Religious Freedom Foundation.

In 2020, he was named a nonresident fellow of the Quincy Institute. Wilkerson was involved in funding meetings for the institute.

Wilkerson is currently a Senior Fellow at the Eisenhower Media Network, a group of former military, intelligence and civilian national security officials who described themselves as offering "alternative analyses untainted by Pentagon or defense industry ties" and countering "Washington's establishment narrative on most national security issues of the day."

== Political positions and statements ==
Since his retirement from the public sector Wilkerson has on several occasions spoken out against what he perceives as the poor planning and execution of the Iraq War as well as the global politics leading up to and following it. In particular he has denounced the decision-making process of the Bush administration and Vice President Dick Cheney's and Secretary of Defense Donald Rumsfeld's parts in it, and regularly describes the Bush administration as having been run by a neoconservative cabal.

In the mid-2000s, he was a regular speaker at Ron Paul's Liberty Caucus. In a September 2006 conference call, Wilkerson expressed support for Wesley Clark and Anthony Zinni. He also endorsed Jim Webb against incumbent George Allen in the 2006 U.S. Senate election in Virginia.

=== Treatment of detainees in Iraq ===
Wilkerson made comments in a radio interview in November 2005 that the Vice President had decided that the Third Geneva Convention (regarding treatment of POWs) would not apply to "al-Qaeda and al-Qaeda look-alike detainees" and that the February 2002 White House memorandum regarding the "Humane Treatment of Taliban and al Qaeda Detainees" contained a loophole designed to avoid applying the Geneva convention to the detainees. According to Wilkerson, the phrase "the detainees (should) be treated humanely and, to the extent appropriate and consistent with military necessity, in a manner consistent with the principles of Geneva" was a way to appear to play by the rules while in reality, the "military necessities" would always overrule concerns about the plight of the detainees. Wilkerson said that this was result of Cheney and Rumsfeld working in collaboration to undermine the standard decision-making process of the White House (which included his superior, Colin Powell).

And so what I'm saying is, under the vice-president's protection, the secretary of defense moved out to do what they wanted to do in the first place even though the president had made a decision that was clearly a compromise.

— Lawrence Wilkerson, BBC Radio 4, November 25, 2005

=== Iraq war intelligence community and Israel's warning against Iraq Invasion ===
In an interview with Inter Press Service in 2007, Wilkerson said that Israeli officials warned the Bush Administration that the invasion of Iraq would destabilize the region. Wilkerson said, "The Israelis were telling us Iraq is not the enemy – Iran is the enemy." Wilkerson further recalled that the warnings against the invasion of Iraq were "pervasive" in Israeli communications with the Bush Administration. He went on further to explain that Israeli officials told the Bush Administration that they "should not be distracted by Iraq and Saddam Hussein."

During an October 19, 2005 speech at the New America Foundation, Wilkerson criticized the intelligence community which compiled the Iraq War intelligence:

I can't tell you why the French, the Germans, the Brits and us thought that most of the material, if not all of it, that we presented at the U.N. on 5 February 2003 was the truth

— Lawrence Wilkerson, New America Foundation, October 19, 2005

Wilkerson did a full-length audio commentary for the documentary Why We Fight. This film won the Grand Jury Prize for Documentary at the 2005 Sundance Film Festival.

In a 2006 interview, Wilkerson said that the speech Powell made before the United Nations on February 5, 2003—which laid out a case for war with Iraq—included falsehoods of which Powell had never been made aware. He said, "My participation in that presentation at the UN constitutes the lowest point in my professional life. I participated in a hoax on the American people, the international community and the United Nations Security Council." Wilkerson said in 2011 that his preparing of the presentation was "probably the biggest mistake of my life", he regrets it, and that he regrets not resigning over it.

He stated in the 2006 interview that neither CIA Director George Tenet nor the CIA analysts that gave Powell information on mobile biological laboratories explained that there were disputes about the reliability of the informants who had supplied the information—information which was used in the speech. Wilkerson also agreed with the interviewer that Cheney's frequent trips to the CIA would have brought "undue influence" on the agency. When asked if Cheney was "the kind of guy who could lean on somebody" he responded, "Absolutely. And be just as quiet and taciturn about it as-- he-- as he leaned on 'em. As he leaned on the Congress recently-- in the-- torture issue." Wilkerson stood by his earlier description of Cheney and Rumsfeld as having formed a cabal to hijack the decision-making process: "I'm worried and I would rather have the discussion and debate in the process we've designed than I would a diktat from a dumb strongman... I'd prefer to see the squabble of democracy to the efficiency of dictators."

=== An Iranian overture, 2003 ===
Wilkerson said in an interview on the BBC's Newsnight, January 17, 2007, that an Iranian offer to help stabilise Iraq after the American invasion, was positively received at the State Department, yet turned down by Dick Cheney. The reported offer consisted of help in stabilizing Iraq, cutting ties with Hezbollah and greater transparency in its nuclear program in return for lifting sanctions and dismantling the Mujahedeen-e Khalq, an organisation working to overthrow the Iranian government.

=== The Iraq war and the "Jewish lobby" ===
In 2006, he told Robert Dreyfuss of American Prospect that he wondered if the "primary allegiance" of Doug Feith and other "neocons" in the Bush Defense Department "was to their own country or to Israel."

In April 2007, Wilkerson was featured in VPRO's Tegenlicht Dutch documentary The Israel Lobby. He said that "the Jewish lobby in America" and "AIPAC in particular" played an outsize influence in the run-up to Iraq war. Wilkerson noted Jewish officials such as Elliott Abrams, Paul Wolfowitz and Richard Perle in particular, and called their loyalty to the United States into question.

His strong criticism of Israel and the pro-Israeli lobby, as well as his use of the term "Jewish lobby", have caused some to accuse him of antisemitism.

=== Guantanamo continues to hold innocent men ===
In March 2009, Wilkerson wrote on The Washington Note blog that he knew from briefings as a Bush administration official that it was soon recognized that some of the captives in Guantanamo were innocent. Wilkerson said the Bush administration was willing to continue to detain innocent men who might nevertheless be aware of useful information about the Afghanistan "mosaic":

- It did not matter if a detainee were innocent. Indeed, because he lived in Afghanistan and was captured on or near the battle area, he must know something of importance.
- ...sufficient information about a village, a region, or a group of individuals, that dots could be connected and terrorists or their plots could be identified.

Wilkerson stated in 2009 that Guantanamo Bay detention camp continues to hold innocent men. Wilkerson said that he felt compelled to come forward after hearing former Vice President Dick Cheney state that President Barack Obama's plans to close Guantanamo made the public less safe. Commander Jeffrey Gordon, a Guantanamo spokesman, declined to comment on Wilkerson's specific observations. Gordon said that "dealing with foreign fighters from a wide variety of countries in a wartime setting was a complex process".

In The New Republic, columnist Jamie Kirchick criticised the plausibility of Wilkerson's allegations, calling him a "third-rate conspiracy theorist and a borderline bigot".

=== Chemical weapons in Syria ===
In 2013, Wilkerson speculated without evidence that Israel had used chemical weapons in Syria. These comments were termed by his critics and supporters of Israel as antisemitic.

Specifically, Wilkerson suggested the Ghouta chemical attack was an Israeli false flag operation to discredit Bashar al-Assad's government in Syria.

=== Iran's democracy ===
In a March 20, 2015 CNN interview, Wilkerson said,

I would say very, very candidly that Iran is probably the most democratic country in the Persian gulf region right now. My Republican colleagues will boil their eyes at that, but it is the most democratic country. It's a theocracy, no question about it. But it is possessed of the democratic tendencies that far outweigh those of, say, Bahrain or Saudi Arabia or even Egypt.

=== Criticism by Michael Rubin ===
In 2016, Michael Rubin of the American Enterprise Institute said Wilkerson had "descended into a fevered swamp of conspiracy and hate". Rubin cited his Israel false flag theories about chemical weapons, alleged he "has flirted on the margins with 9/11 conspiracy theories", was regularly a guest on Russian state broadcaster RT, and is close to Lyndon LaRouche associate Robert Dreyfuss.

=== Trump administration foreign policy ===
Wilkerson showed concern over the first Trump administration's foreign policy behavior, particularly on Iran and Trump's work against the Iran nuclear deal.

In September 2018, Wilkerson further said that the neoconservative agenda regarding war on Syria and Iran also threatened conflict between the U.S. and Russia and the long-term bogging down of U.S. military forces in major conflict. Wilkerson stated: "My serious concern is about the way U.S. National Security Advisor John Bolton and others in their positions of power now are orchestrating a scenario whereby Donald Trump, for political reasons or whatever, can use force in a significant way against Assad and ultimately Iran, because Iran's forces are there, and ultimately against Russia, because their forces are there in Syria, and this is most disquieting." The neoconservatives' military plan, argues Wilkerson, is "a recipe for" the U.S. military being in the region for "the next generation" with significant force "mired even deeper in this morass" and with the "day after day" attrition of dollars and lives.

=== Role of military relative to climate change ===
Wilkerson stated in a 2022 Massachusetts Peace Action YouTube video, that climate change and nuclear war overshadow all other concerns. In a May 2022 editorial for the Quincy Institute, he considered the role of the U.S. and other militaries in coping with famines that result from climate change and war.

== Personal life ==
Wilkerson married Barbara Ann Wilkerson in 1966, just before he entered the Vietnam War. They had two children, a son and a daughter, who both served in the military. Barbara Ann Wilkerson died on November 28, 2021, at the age of 71.

Wilkerson heads the Colin Powell Leadership Club, a group of MacFarland middle school students in Washington, D.C.

He is a lifelong Republican and on the political right.

== Awards ==
Wilkerson was the 2009 recipient of the Sam Adams Award for Integrity in Intelligence.
