= Margaret Peterlin =

American lawyer and government official (born 1970)

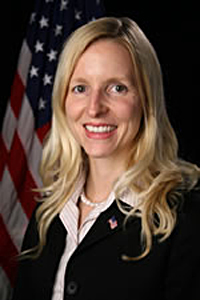
- Peterlin in 2007

Chief of Staff to the United States Secretary of State
- In office February 12, 2017 – March 31, 2018
- President: Donald Trump
- Secretary: Rex Tillerson
- Preceded by: Jonathan Finer
- Succeeded by: Suzy George

Personal details
- Born: October 9, 1970 (age 56) Daleville, Alabama, U.S.
- Education: College of the Holy Cross (BA); University of Chicago (JD)

Military service
- Allegiance: United States
- Branch/service: United States Navy
- Years of service: 1993–1997

Margaret Judith Ann Peterlin (born October 9, 1970) is an American lawyer. She was the Chief of Staff to the United States Secretary of State from February 2017 until the end of March 2018. She was appointed to the position by former Secretary of State Rex Tillerson. Since July 2018, she has been the senior vice president of global external and public affairs for AT&T.

== Early life and education ==
Peterlin was born in Daleville, Alabama. Her father was a commissioned military officer. She graduated from the College of the Holy Cross with a Bachelor of Arts in political science in 1993, then became a commissioned officer in the United States Navy. She served for four years in the Navy's communications field. During her military service, she completed the Navy's Legal Officer Course, graduating first in her class.

After finishing her naval service, Peterlin earned her Juris Doctor (J.D.), cum laude, from the University of Chicago Law School in 2000. As a law student, she founded the Chicago Journal of International Law and served as its first editor-in-chief.

== Career ==
=== Federal clerkship ===
After graduating from law school, Peterlin clerked for Judge Jerry Edwin Smith, of the U.S. Court of Appeals for the 5th Circuit, from 2000 to 2001.

=== United States Navy ===
Peterlin was a Command Administrative Officer and a Communications Officer in the United States Navy She was selected as a White House Social Aide, and was awarded the Navy Commendation Medal and Navy Achievement Medal.

=== Capitol Hill ===
In mid-2001, Peterlin joined the staff of House Majority Leader Dick Armey, working as his Counsel for Legal Policy and National Security Advisor, and later was National Security Advisor for House Speaker Dennis Hastert. She helped draft the Authorization for the Use of Military Force in Afghanistan and the Patriot Act, as well as the legislation establishing the United States Department of Homeland Security.

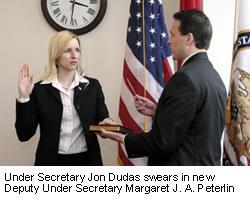
May 8, 2007

=== Commerce Department ===
Peterlin worked at the United States Patent and Trademark Office, an agency of the United States Department of Commerce, as its Deputy Director, as well as the Deputy Under Secretary of Commerce for Intellectual Property.

=== Private sector ===
After leaving government, Peterlin worked as a technology strategy officer at Mars, and later was chief executive officer of Profectus Global Corp, a small advisory firm located in Arlington, Virginia. Prior to joining the Department of State, Peterlin was managing director at XLP Capital, a Boston-based technology consulting firm, a role she began in November 2015.

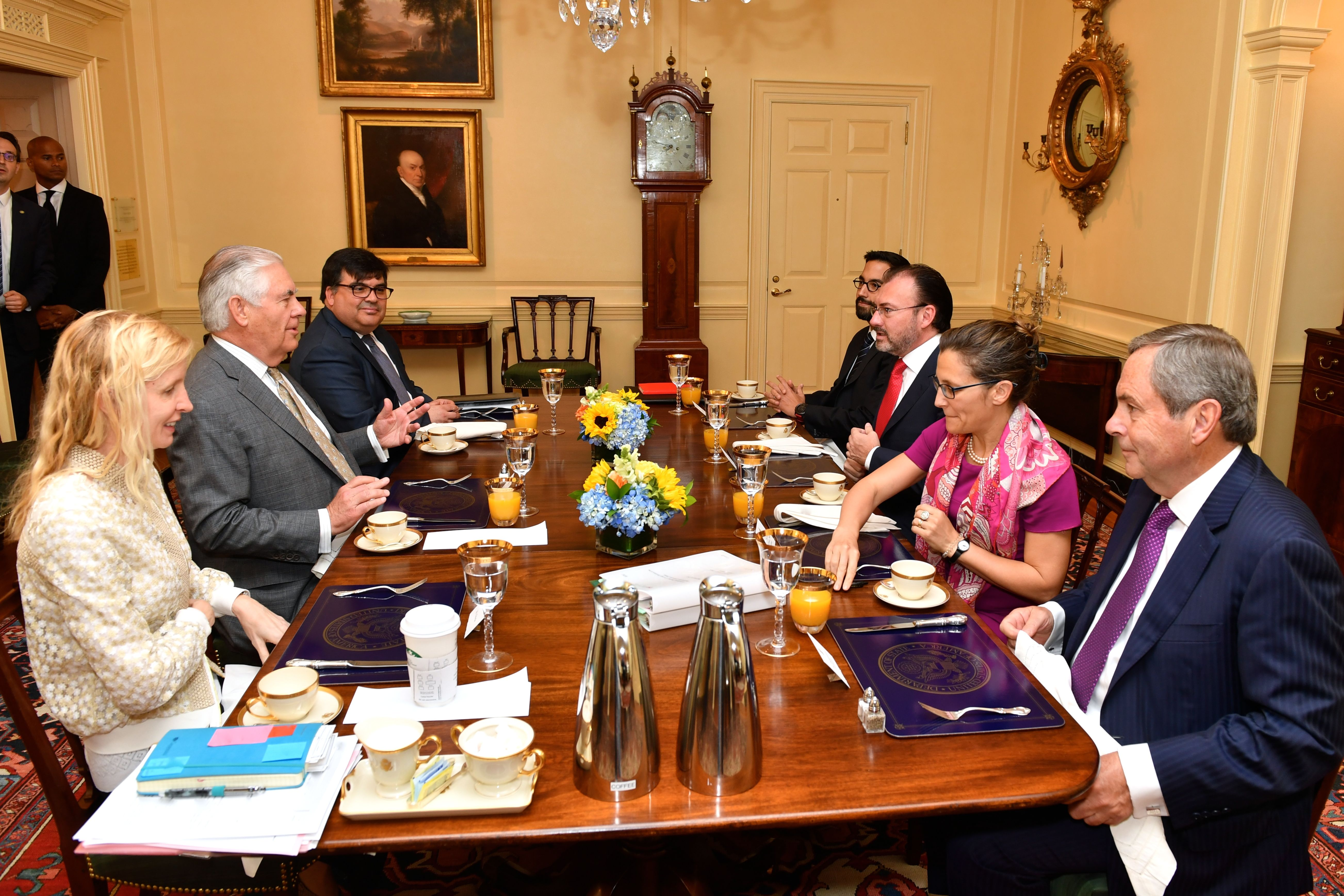
Peterlin (far left) at a working breakfast for Mexican Foreign Secretary Videgaray and Canadian Foreign Minister Freeland in Washington, May 31, 2017

=== State Department ===
Peterlin was initially chosen by President-elect Donald Trump's 2016 transition team to help Rex Tillerson during the Senate confirmation process. She developed a rapport with Tillerson, who invited her to be his chief of staff. According to press accounts, Peterlin has been described as a "fierce gatekeeper." She has also helped to impose sharp restrictions on both the media's and State Department staffers' access to Tillerson.

Peterlin left the State Department effective March 31, 2018, following the firing of Tillerson.
