= Daniel Holler =

American political operative (born 1983)

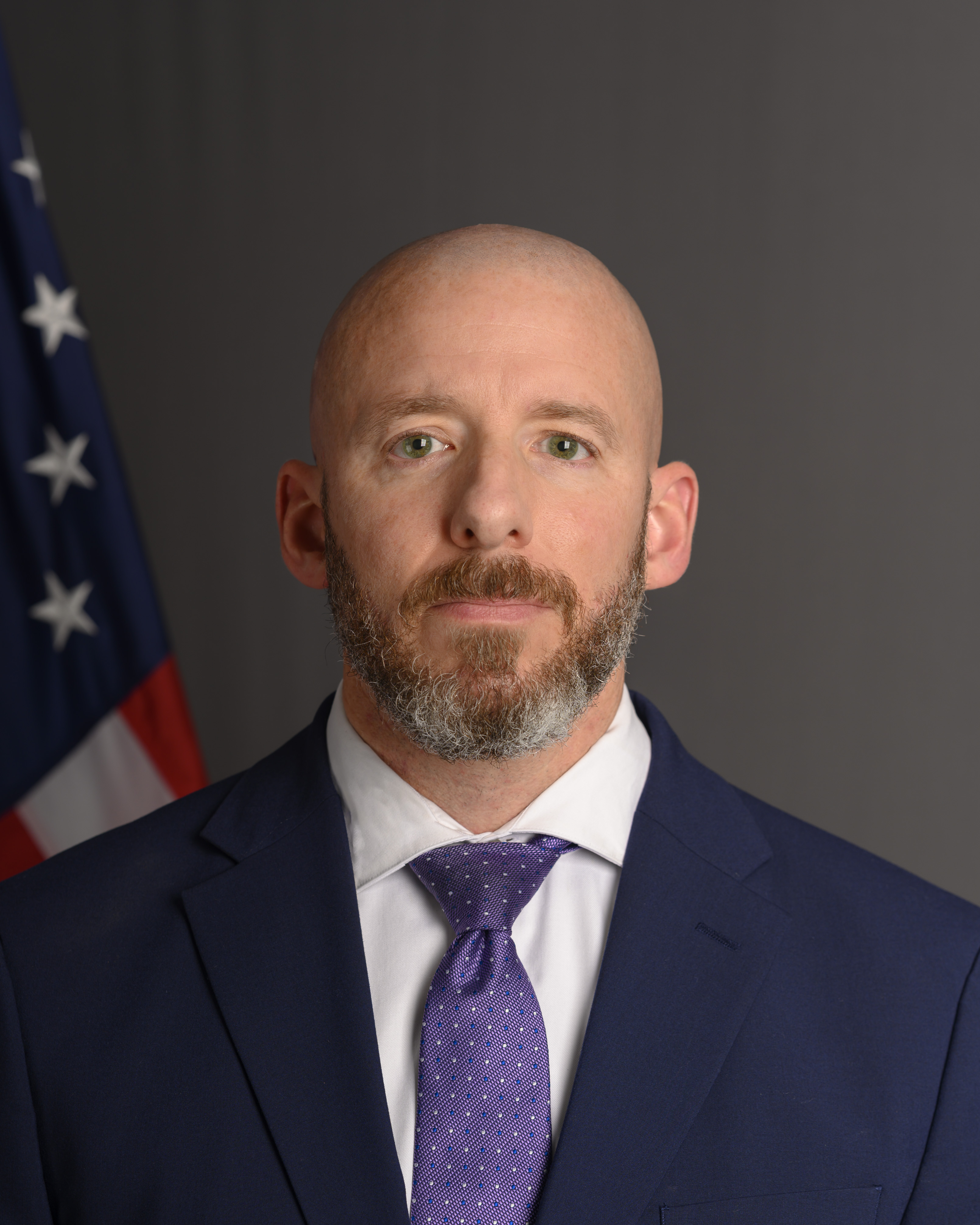
- Official portrait, 2025

Acting Director of Policy Planning
- In office May 26, 2026 – August 24, 2026
- President: Donald Trump
- Preceded by: Michael Needham
- Succeeded by: Jeremy Lewin

38th Counselor of the United States Department of State
- Incumbent
- Assumed office May 26, 2026
- President: Donald Trump
- Preceded by: Michael Needham

Chief of Staff to the Secretary of State
- In office September 19, 2025 – May 26, 2026
- President: Donald Trump
- Preceded by: Michael Needham
- Succeeded by: Matt Rhodes

Personal details
- Born: Daniel Joseph Holler; January 19, 1983 (age 43)
- Education: Washington College (BA)

Daniel Joseph Holler Sr. (born January 19, 1983) is an American political operative and foreign policy advisor who has served as the Counselor of the United States Department of State since May 2026. Holler served as the acting director of policy planning and the chief of staff to the secretary of state from September 2025 to May 2026 and as the deputy chief of staff to the secretary of state from January 2025 to May 2026.

== Early life and education ==
Daniel Joseph Holler Sr. was born on January 19, 1983. Holler graduated from Francis Scott Key High School in 2001. He graduated from Washington College in 2005.

== Career ==
=== The Heritage Foundation and Heritage Action (2005–2018) ===
After graduating from Washington College, Holler joined The Heritage Foundation as an intern. By December 2008, he had become the deputy director of Senate relations for the foundation. He had become a spokesman for Heritage Action by July 2010 and its vice president of communications and government relations by March 2017. According to Politico, Holler was among several individuals attempting to repeal the Affordable Care Act in May 2018.

=== Deputy chief of staff for Marco Rubio (2018–2025) ===
In June 2018, Roll Call reported that Holler had become the deputy chief of staff to Florida senator Marco Rubio. He had become Rubio's chief strategist in January 2024.

== United States Department of State (2025–present) ==
After being sworn in as the secretary of state, Rubio hired Holler and Michael Needham. Holler became Rubio's deputy chief of staff. In September, Rubio named Holler as his chief of staff, succeeding Michael Needham. In May 2026, Axios reported that Rubio had named Needham as a deputy national security advisor. He appointed Holler to succeed Needham as the counselor of the Department of State and the acting director of policy planning. Holler was succeeded as Rubio's chief of staff by Matt Rhodes. Holler and U.S. ambassador to Israel Mike Huckabee are leading the U.S. delegation on the next U.S.–Israel memorandum of understanding.
