= Jeremy Lewin =

American civil servant

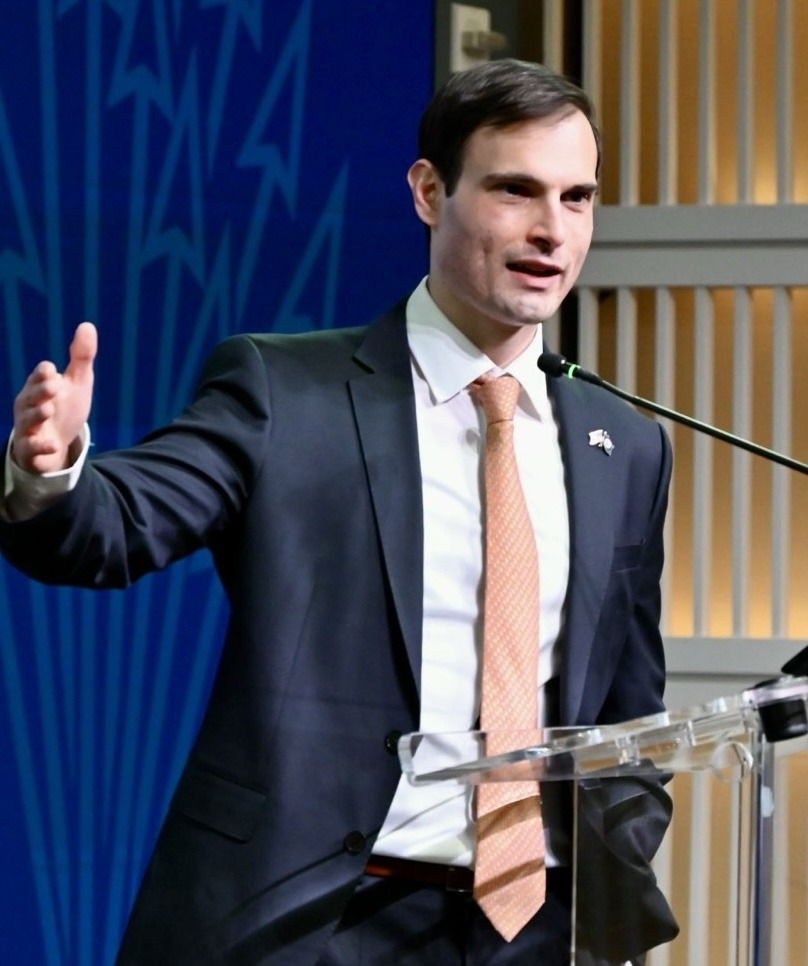

Director of Policy Planning
- In office August 24, 2026 – October 27, 2026
- President: Donald Trump
- Preceded by: Daniel Holler (acting)

Under Secretary of State for Foreign Assistance, Humanitarian Affairs and Religious Freedom
- Acting
- In office July 11, 2025 – August 28, 2026
- President: Donald Trump
- Preceded by: Albert Gombis (acting)
- Succeeded by: Andrew Veprek (acting)

Personal details
- Born: 1996 or 1997 (age 29–30)
- Education: Dartmouth College (BA); Harvard University (JD)

Jeremy P. Lewin is an American lawyer, former government official, and former investment banker who served as Director of Policy Planning at the United States Department of State from August to October 2026. He previously served as acting Under Secretary of State for Foreign Assistance, Humanitarian Affairs and Religious Freedom from July 2025 to August 2026, and was affiliated with the Department of Government Efficiency.

== Early life and education ==
Lewin attended Buckingham Browne & Nichols School, a private school in Cambridge, Massachusetts, graduating in 2015. He later received his BA from Dartmouth College and a JD from Harvard Law School. He was a member of the Federalist Society at Harvard.

== Career ==
After his law school graduation, he was a law clerk for Judge Judith W. Rogers of the United States Court of Appeals for the District of Columbia Circuit. In 2024, he joined Munger, Tolles & Olson as a trial lawyer.

Lewin joined the second Trump administration as a member of the Department of Government Efficiency (DOGE), appointed deputy administrator for policy and programs for USAID, and helped oversee the agency's dismantling. Lewin authored memos detailing the decommissioning of the agency, including one titled "USAID's Final Mission"; shortly after, remaining staff were fired.

In October 2026, Wired published an investigation into Lewin's work at USAID, reporting that Lewin was never onboarded by the Human Resources team at USAID and that there were no records of his employment there. Internal USAID emails revealed that during the three-week period of March 18 to April 4, Lewin began canceling aid programs and personally signed off on the termination of thousands of USAID employees. However, he did not sign the paperwork typically required by law to begin work at the agency, despite repeated requests. USAID security was unable to issue him an ID card because they had no records of his employment. A July 2025 study in The Lancet estimated that the USAID funding cuts could result in millions of additional deaths by 2030, mostly among children.

In June 2025, Lewin waived nine mandatory anti-fraud and counterterrorism safeguards in an effort to expedite a $30 million award to the US and Israeli-backed Gaza Humanitarian Foundation.

In late June 2026, news media outlets reported that Lewin would leave the State Department for the White House, to become deputy assistant to the president and senior director for Western Hemisphere affairs at the National Security Council. A few days later, on July 2, 2026, Politico reported that the planned move "was delayed," following a campaign against Lewin by far-right political activist Laura Loomer, and that he would remain at State instead. In August 2026, Lewin was appointed Director of Policy Planning, where he focused on U.S. policy toward Venezuela and Cuba.

On October 27, 2026, Lewin announced that he was leaving the State Department for the private sector.

== Controversy ==
In April 2025, Rolling Stone published an investigation based on interviews with at least ten people who knew Lewin, including a woman who had made a police complaint alleging Lewin threatened her with a knife and others who alleged that Lewin had assaulted a private school classmate and made racist remarks.
