= Chicago Journal of International Law =

- Discipline: International law
- Language: English

Publication details
- History: Spring 2000 (Vol. 1., No. 1) to Present
- Publisher: University of Chicago Law School (USA)
- Frequency: Semiannual

Standard abbreviations
- Bluebook: Chi. J. Int'l L.
- ISO 4: Chic. J. Int. Law

Indexing
- ISSN: 1529-0816

Links
- Journal homepage

The Chicago Journal of International Law is a semiannual, student-edited law review published by the University of Chicago Law School. Founded by Margaret Peterlin in 2000, the journal publishes articles covering international law, international relations, and related policy issues. Its articles are often interdisciplinary in focus, and the journal's format allows it to examine international legal issues in a broader cultural and political context. The Chicago Journal of International Law is one of the three student-edited law journals published at the University of Chicago Law School.

Although relatively young, the journal has quickly gained attention in legal circles as a leading international law journal in terms of scholarly impact and influence. In a 2020 ranking of law journals based on a combination of the impact factor and citations, the Chicago Journal of International Law ranked 2nd among student-edited international and comparative law reviews.

The journal's articles are covered by several academic abstracting services, including LegalTrac, EconLit, and CSA Worldwide Political Science Abstracts. The full text of the journal's articles is available via LexisNexis, Westlaw, ProQuest, and HeinOnline.

== History ==
The journal was established during the University of Chicago Law School's 1999-2000 academic year. Its first editor-in-chief was Margaret Peterlin. Since then, it has published seventeen volumes (two issues each) of groundbreaking scholarship in international law with a focus on fields such as law and economics, international administrative law, and human rights.

In 2002, when the journal was working on its second volume, it merged with The University of Chicago Law School Roundtable: A Journal of Interdisciplinary Legal Studies.

== Editor Selection ==
University of Chicago law students are selected to join the journal as staff members each year by that year's incoming managing board of editors through a blind writing competition, held after the participants' first year of law school. The journal also allows law students to "write on" to the journal, through its Topic Access Program, to become staff members by submitting a publishable piece of legal scholarship. The outgoing managing board selects the next year's editors each spring, generally from among the current staff.
