= Bureau of Disaster and Humanitarian Response =

U.S. State Department bureau

- Seal of the United States Department of State

Bureau overview
- Formed: March 20, 2026; 7 months ago
- Jurisdiction: Federal government of the United States
- Headquarters: Harry S Truman Building, Washington, D.C., U.S.
- Bureau executive: Ryan Shrum, Senior Bureau Official
- Parent Bureau: United States Department of State
- Website: www.state.gov/bureaus-offices/under-secretary-for-foreign-assistance-humanitarian-affairs-and-religious-freedom/bureau-of-disaster-and-humanitarian-response

The Bureau of Disaster and Humanitarian Response (DHR) is a bureau in the U.S. Department of State. According to its mission, DHR "leads the U.S. government’s response to sudden-onset disasters and high-priority, complex humanitarian situations overseas. DHR also provides U.S. government-wide policy leadership on food security and nutrition and management of longer-term, high-impact agricultural research and innovation partnerships."

== History ==
On March 20, 2026, the Department of State created the Bureau of Disaster and Humanitarian Response, inheriting remaining programs from the United States Agency for International Development.

== Organizational structure ==
According to the Department's organizational chart, the bureau is to be headed by an Assistant Secretary of State. The bureau is overseen by the Under Secretary of State for Foreign Assistance, Humanitarian Affairs, and Religious Freedom.

According to Trump administration officials, the bureau would be staffed by about 200 officials, operate in twelve hubs around the world. and receive roughly $5.4 billion a year in funding. The new bureau’s regional hubs will be located in:

- Miami, Florida
- Bogota, Colombia
- Guatemala City
- Santo Domingo, Dominican Republic
- Kyiv, Ukraine
- Amman, Jordan
- Addis Ababa, Ethiopia
- Nairobi, Kenya
- Dakar, Senegal
- Bangkok, Thailand
- Dhaka, Bangladesh
- Manila, Philippines

== See also ==
- Under Secretary of State for Foreign Assistance, Humanitarian Affairs, and Religious Freedom
- USAID in the second Trump administration
- Foreign aid of the United States
