= Under Secretary of State for Foreign Assistance, Humanitarian Affairs, and Religious Freedom =

U.S. diplomatic position

United States Under Secretary of State for Foreign Assistance, Humanitarian Affairs, and Religious Freedom
- Seal of the United States Department of State

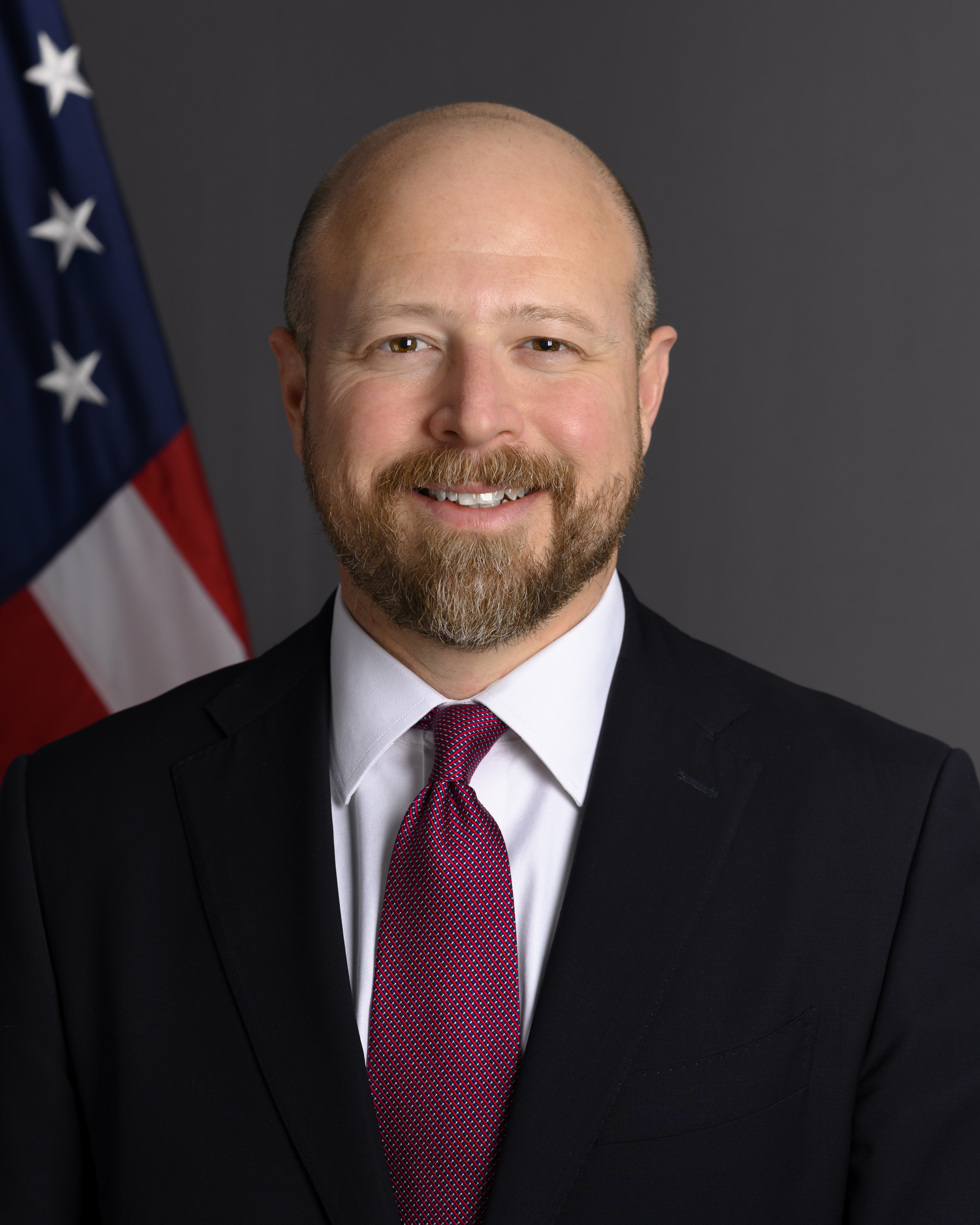
- Incumbent; Andrew Veprek (Senior Official) since August 28, 2026
- United States Department of State
- Style: The Honorable
- Reports to: The United States Secretary of State
- Seat: Washington, D.C.
- Appointer: The president; with Senate advice and consent
- Term length: No fixed term
- Precursor: Under Secretary of State for Civilian Security, Democracy, and Human Rights
- Inaugural holder: Jeremy Lewin
- Formation: 2025
- Salary: Executive Schedule, Level 3
- Website: Official website

The under secretary of state for foreign assistance, humanitarian affairs and religious freedom is an undersecretary position within the U.S. Department of State that leads the State Department's foreign assistance efforts. The under secretary oversees the Bureau of Democracy, Human Rights, and Labor, the Bureau of Population, Refugees, and Migration, the Bureau of Global Health Security and Diplomacy, the Office of Foreign Assistance Oversight, and the Bureau of Disaster and Humanitarian Response, which are collectively referred to as the "F family" or "F bureau."

According to the State Department's website, the under secretary's mission "ensures effective management and oversight of foreign assistance programs, coordinates international disaster, crisis and humanitarian response efforts, supports global immigration and border security, and advances the Department’s values-based diplomatic agenda. The bureaus reporting to the Under Secretary advance the national interests of the American people by strategically deploying foreign assistance funds to further national security, trade, and humanitarian priorities, advocating for tranquility and respect for free speech, religious freedom and natural rights around the world, and helping partner nations respond to crises and ensure shared security and prosperity."

== History ==
Previously known as the under secretary for civilian security, democracy, and human rights, the position was renamed in 2025, during the second Trump administration. The new under secretary position took responsibility of foreign assistance programs that were transferred from the U.S. Agency for International Development.

== List of under secretaries of state for foreign assistance, humanitarian affairs, and religious freedom ==
| # | Name | Assumed office | Left office | President(s) served under |
|---|---|---|---|---|
| - | Jeremy Lewin (as senior official, by designation) | July 11, 2025 | August 28, 2026 | Donald Trump |
| - | Andrew Veprek (as senior official, by designation) | August 28, 2026 | Present | Donald Trump |

== See also ==
- USAID in the second Trump administration
- Administrator of the United States Agency for International Development
- United States Ambassador-at-Large for International Religious Freedom
