= Suzy George =

American attorney and foreign policy advisor

Chief of Staff to the United States Secretary of State
- In office January 20, 2021 – January 20, 2025
- President: Joe Biden
- Secretary: Antony Blinken
- Preceded by: Margaret Peterlin
- Succeeded by: Michael Needham

Executive Secretary and Chief of Staff of the United States National Security Council
- In office July 29, 2014 – January 20, 2017
- President: Barack Obama
- Preceded by: Brian P. McKeon
- Succeeded by: Keith Kellogg

Personal details
- Education: Mount Holyoke College (BA); George Washington University (JD)

Suzanne George is an American attorney and foreign policy advisor who served as chief of staff to the United States secretary of state in the Biden administration.

== Education ==
George earned a BA from Mount Holyoke College and a JD from George Washington University Law School.

== Career ==
From 1990 to 1993, George worked for the National Democratic Institute. From 1995 to 1997, she served as a special assistant and assistant counsel in the Office of the Ambassador of the United States to the United Nations. From 1997 to 2001, George was deputy chief of staff to the United States secretary of state. After leaving government service, George joined the Albright Group, a strategic advisory firm founded by former secretary of state Madeleine Albright. George was one of the founders of the merged Albright Stonebridge Group, also serving as its Principal.

George later worked in foreign policy and national security roles in the Obama administration, including deputy assistant to the president and chief of staff of the CIA's Directorate of Operations. She was appointed executive secretary and chief of staff of the United States National Security Council in July 2014.

After serving as the chief operating officer for the One Campaign from 2018 to 2021, George joined the Biden-Harris Transition team.

She was appointed chief of staff to the United States secretary of state on January 20, 2021, serving until the end of the Biden administration in January 2025.
