= Keith Kellogg =

Retired Lieutenant General in the United States Army (born 1944)

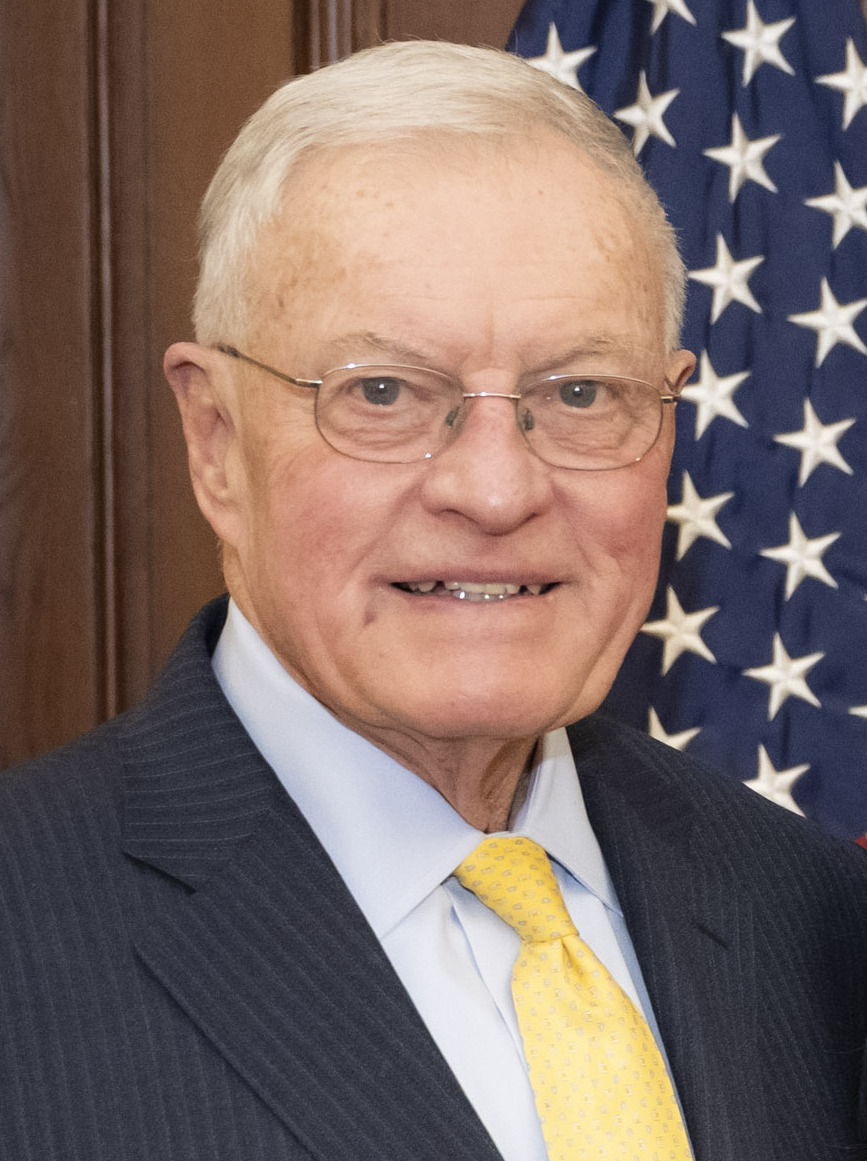
- Kellogg in 2025

United States Special Envoy for Ukraine
- In office March 15, 2025 – December 31, 2025
- President: Donald Trump
- Deputy: John Coale
- Preceded by: Position established
- Succeeded by: Vacant

United States Special Envoy for Ukraine and Russia
- In office January 20, 2025 – March 15, 2025
- President: Donald Trump
- Preceded by: Position established
- Succeeded by: Position abolished

National Security Advisor to the Vice President of the United States
- In office April 27, 2018 – January 20, 2021
- Vice President: Mike Pence
- Preceded by: Andrea L. Thompson
- Succeeded by: Nancy McEldowney

Executive Secretary and Chief of Staff of the United States National Security Council
- In office January 20, 2017 – April 27, 2018
- President: Donald Trump
- Preceded by: Suzy George
- Succeeded by: Frederick H. Fleitz

Acting United States National Security Advisor
- In office February 13, 2017 – February 20, 2017
- President: Donald Trump
- Preceded by: Michael Flynn
- Succeeded by: H. R. McMaster

Personal details
- Born: Joseph Keith Kellogg Jr. May 12, 1944 (age 82) Dayton, Ohio, U.S.
- Party: Republican
- Spouse: Paige Kellogg
- Children: 3
- Education: Santa Clara University (BA); University of Kansas (MS)

Military service
- Allegiance: United States
- Branch/service: United States Army
- Years of service: 1967–2003
- Rank: Lieutenant General
- Commands: 82nd Airborne Division; Special Operations Command Europe
- Battles/wars: Vietnam War; Operation Just Cause; Persian Gulf War
- Awards: Army Distinguished Service Medal; Silver Star; Defense Superior Service Medal; Legion of Merit (2 with one oak leaf cluster); Bronze Star Medal (5, with valor)

Joseph Keith Kellogg Jr. (born May 12, 1944) is an American diplomat and retired lieutenant general in the United States Army. He previously served as the national security advisor to Vice President Mike Pence, and as the executive secretary and chief of staff of the United States National Security Council in the first Trump administration. He held the position of national security advisor on an acting basis following the resignation of Michael Flynn. Kellogg served as the United States Special Envoy for Ukraine and Russia and later as the United States Special Envoy for Ukraine during the Second Presidency of Donald Trump.

== Early life and education ==
Kellogg was born in Dayton, Ohio, the son of Helen (Costello) and Joseph Keith Kellogg. In 1961, he received his diploma from Long Beach Polytechnic High School. Kellogg was commissioned into the Army through the Reserve Officers Training Corps (ROTC) at Santa Clara University as an infantry officer. During his time in service, Kellogg earned an M.S. in international affairs from the University of Kansas. Kellogg later went on to study senior-level management and diplomacy at the United States Army War College.

== Military service ==
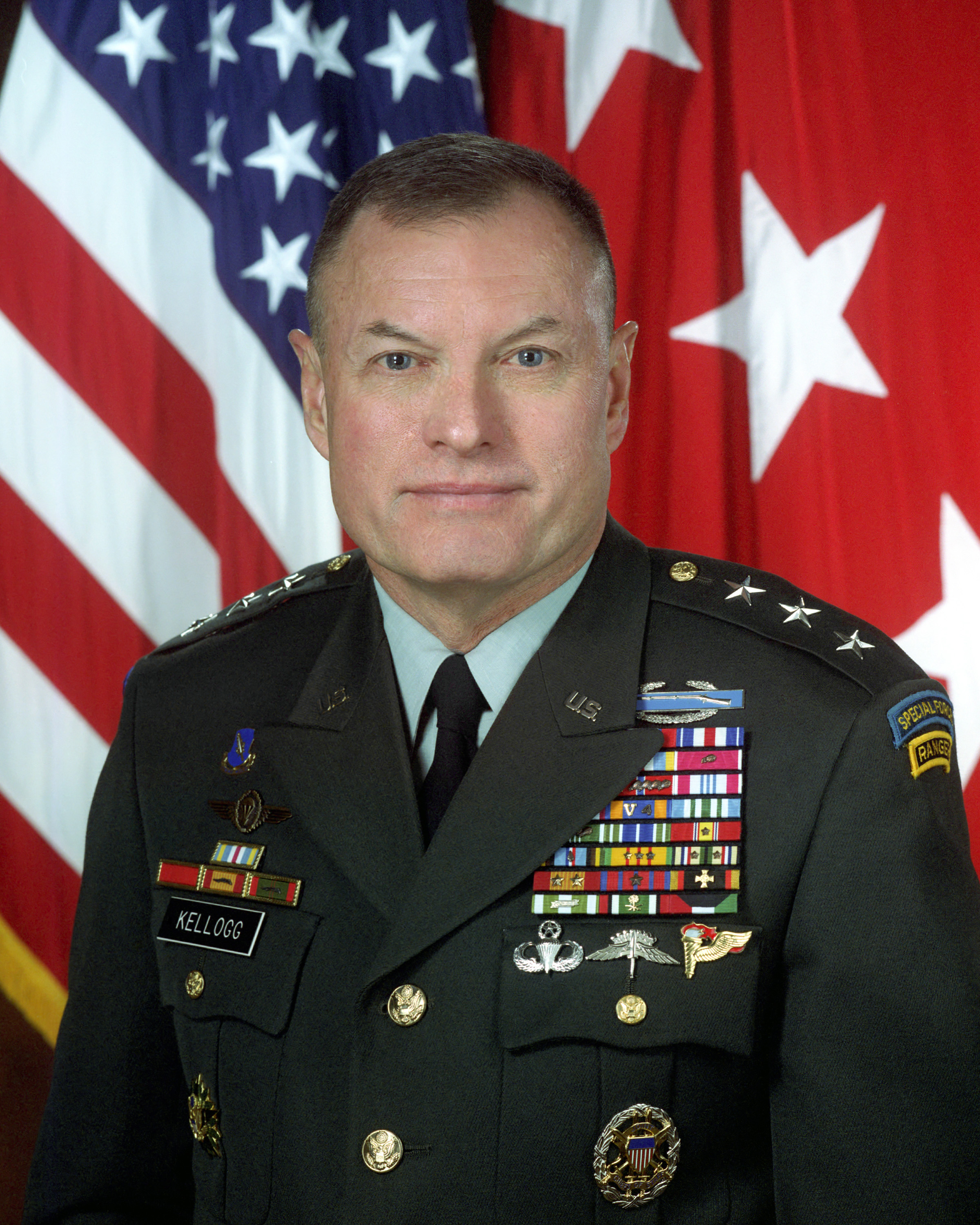
Official portrait of Lieutenant General Keith Kellogg as J6 to the Joint Chiefs of Staff

During the Vietnam War, he served in the 101st Airborne Division and, after qualifying as a U.S. Army Special Forces officer, as a special forces adviser to the Cambodian Army. It was during his time in Vietnam that Kellogg earned the Silver Star, Bronze Star with "V" Device, and Air Medal with "V" Device.

In 1985, then-LTC Kellogg commanded 1st Battalion, 504th Parachute Infantry Regiment, which became the first light infantry unit to rotate to the Fort Irwin National Training Center (NTC) located in the Mojave Desert. Kellogg later commanded 3rd Brigade, 7th Infantry Division during Operation Just Cause.

During the 1990–1991 Gulf War, Kellogg served in the 82nd Airborne Division, first as chief of staff and then as assistant commander. Kellogg subsequently served as the Commander of Special Operations Command Europe (SOCEUR) and then took command of the 82nd Airborne Division in 1996.

Kellogg was a lieutenant general serving as the Joint Staff's J6 (Director of Command, Control, Communications, and Computers) in the Pentagon during the attacks on September 11, 2001. He retired from the Army in 2003.

== Career ==
=== Early career ===
Following Kellogg's retirement from active duty, he joined Oracle Corporation as an adviser to its homeland security division, but from December 2003 to 2004, he held a leading position in the Coalition Provisional Authority (CPA). Kellogg served in Baghdad as Chief Operating Officer for the CPA, the transition government of Iraq after the 2003 U.S.-led invasion and the disbanding of the Iraqi Army. During this time, Kellogg, with a reputation as an "expediter" known for cutting through red tape, was tasked with ensuring speed and discipline during the massive reconstruction process. Following his service with the CPA, Kellogg was awarded the Department of Defense Medal for Distinguished Public Service.

He held positions with CACI International Inc. and later Cubic Corporation starting in January 2005.

=== First Trump administration ===
Kellogg with President Donald Trump and H. R. McMaster, 2017

The Donald Trump 2016 presidential campaign named Kellogg a foreign policy advisor in March 2016. Trump put Kellogg in charge of the presidential transition agency action team for defense. On December 15, 2016, President-elect Donald Trump announced plans to appoint Kellogg as Chief of Staff and Executive Secretary of the United States National Security Council.

On February 13, 2017, following the resignation of Michael Flynn, Kellogg became the Acting National Security Advisor until Trump appointed a permanent replacement. President Trump interviewed Kellogg and three others, ultimately selecting H. R. McMaster.

In April 2018, Vice President Mike Pence chose Kellogg to serve as his national security advisor. According to the White House, Kellogg would continue to serve as an assistant to Trump.

During the Trump–Ukraine scandal, which led to Trump's impeachment (and subsequent acquittal), Kellogg said he "heard nothing wrong or improper" in Trump's call with the Ukrainian president.

Kellogg spoke at the 2020 Republican National Convention on August 26, 2020.

Kellogg was with Trump in the White House as the January 6 United States Capitol attack occurred and defended Pence's decision not to leave the Capitol. While the Secret Service was attempting to get Pence to a safer place, Pence insisted on staying. Kellogg reportedly told then-White House Deputy Chief of Staff for Operations Anthony Ornato, formerly with the Secret Service, why Pence would not evacuate. "You can't do that, Tony. Leave him where he's at. He's got a job to do. I know you guys too well. You'll fly him to Alaska if you have a chance. Don't do it." Kellogg made it clear that Pence would stay, even if he needed to remain all night. Kellogg testified under oath to the United States House Select Committee on the January 6 Attack in December 2021 that the president's staff encouraged the president to take immediate action to quell the unrest but that he refused.

In June 2024, Kellogg and Frederick H. Fleitz, who had also served on Trump's National Security Council staff, presented Trump with a detailed peace plan to end Russia's war in Ukraine. The plan proposes a ceasefire on the current front lines, forcing both Russia and Ukraine into peace talks, and continued military aid to Ukraine if it agrees to a ceasefire and peace talks. If Russia did not also agree to a ceasefire and peace talks, the United States would increase arms supplies to Ukraine. Ukraine would not have to formally cede the occupied and annexed territories to Russia, but would postpone its plans for NATO membership for a longer period of time, and the territories currently under Russian occupation would remain under de facto Russian control. Kellogg and Fleitz said their main concern is that the war has devolved into attrition warfare that could wipe out an entire generation of young men in both countries.

=== Between Trump administrations ===
From 2021 until 2025 he was chairman of the Center for a New American Security at the America First Policy Institute.

=== Second Trump administration ===
In November 2024, President-elect Trump selected Kellogg to be his special envoy for Ukraine and Russia. Kellogg was notably more supportive of Ukraine than other Trump-aligned foreign policy experts.

Politico reported that several of his actions caused him to lose the confidence of the White House in February 2025. People close to Donald Trump criticized him for hiring former State Department spokeswoman Heather Nauert as an advisor, as she was considered too favorable to Ukraine. Kellogg was excluded from a meeting with Russian Foreign Minister Sergey Lavrov in Saudi Arabia on February 18, 2025. The White House also criticized him for not objecting to Ukrainian leaders' criticism of the Trump administration during a meeting with Volodymyr Zelenskyy in Kyiv at the same time. The White House ordered Kellogg to cancel a press conference scheduled for after the meeting.

On March 15, his role was limited to Special Envoy for Ukraine after Russian complaints. Subsequently, Steve Witkoff became Trump's de facto envoy for Russia.

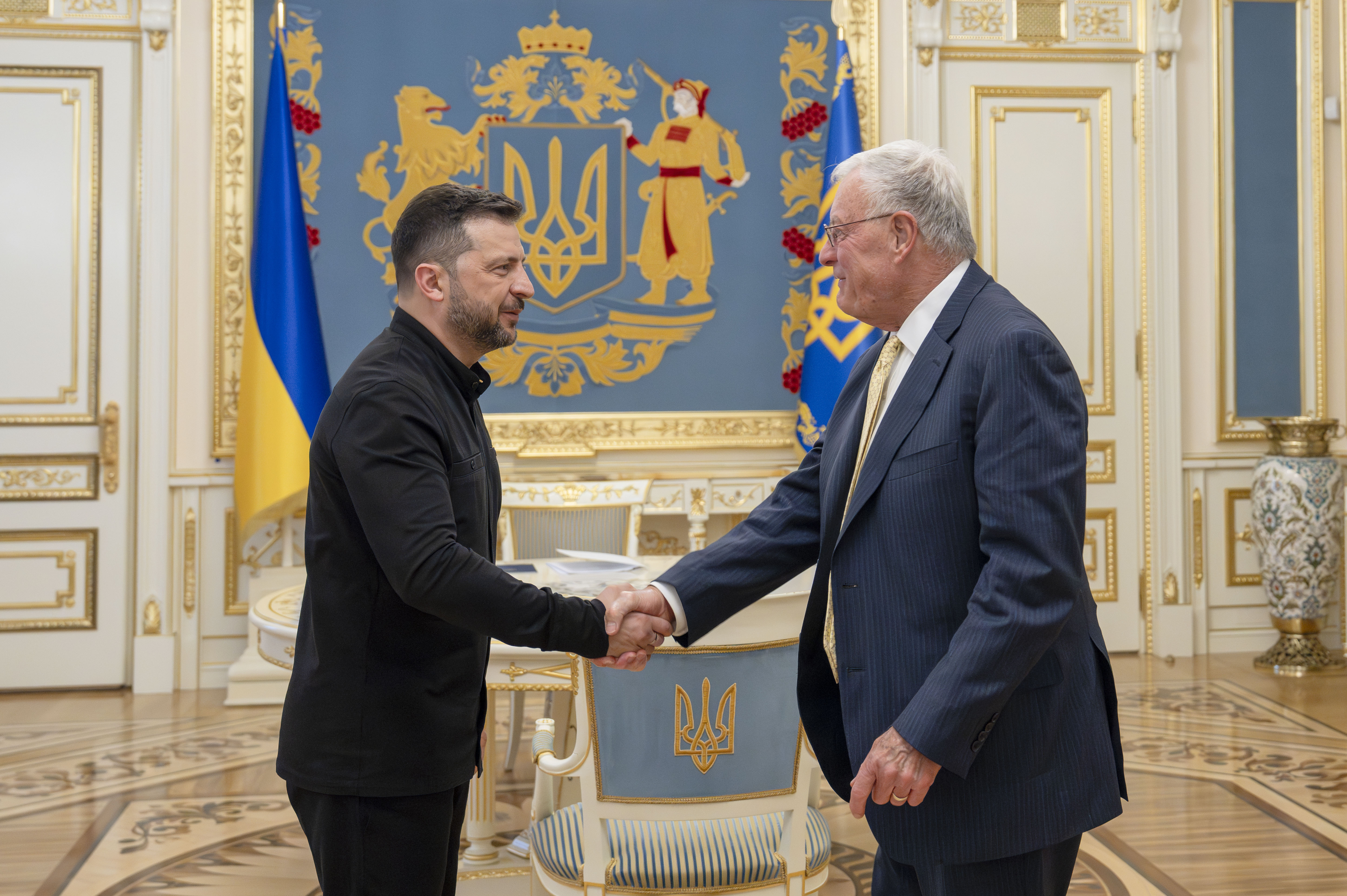
Keith Kellogg visits Volodymyr Zelenskyy in Kyiv, 2025

On April 13, 2025, Russia launched a ballistic missile strike in Sumy, Ukraine, on the fourth Palm Sunday since the start of their invasion of Ukraine. In response, Kellogg said the Sumy attack crossed "any line of decency" and that the White House remained committed to ending the conflict. "There are scores of civilian dead and wounded. As a former military leader, I understand targeting, and this is wrong," he said.

On June 21, 2025, Kellogg met with Belarusian President Alexander Lukashenko in Minsk, Belarus. Following Kellogg's visit to Belarus, Belarusian opposition leader Sergei Tikhanovsky was released from prison, along with 13 other political prisoners.

On August 24, 2025, during the Independence Day of Ukraine celebrations, President of Ukraine Volodymyr Zelenskyy awarded Kellogg the Order of Merit, 1st Class.

In November 2025, it was reported that Kellogg would leave his position in January 2026. Reuters reported that Kellogg was viewed as sympathetic to the Ukrainian and European positions on the war, and had at times clashed with Trump's Special Envoy for Peace Missions Steve Witkoff whose proposed 28-point U.S. peace plan had recently been reported. Kellogg left the administration on December 31, 2025.

=== Post-Trump administrations ===
In 2026, Kellogg joined the BGR Group's advisory board. He also rejoined the America First Policy Institute.

== Personal life ==
Kellogg married his wife, Paige, in 1980. She is a former U.S. Army officer and paratrooper who served during the 1983 U.S. invasion of Grenada. Together, they have three children.

Kellogg is the second-oldest of four children. His older brother, Mike Kellogg, is a former professional American football player and Los Angeles County Superior Court Judge. His sister, Kathy, is a former actress who is now a clinical psychologist. His younger brother, Jeff, is a former city councilman of Long Beach, California, served as president of the Long Beach Community College District Board of Trustees, and now works for the California Community Colleges system.

== Awards and decorations ==
Silver Star Citation

Awarded for actions during the Vietnam War

First Lieutenant (Infantry) Joseph Keith Kellogg, United States Army, was awarded the Silver Star for gallantry in action while serving with the 101st Airborne Division during Operation EAGLE THRUST in the Republic of Vietnam. During an air assault, Lieutenant Kellogg pulled a wounded man from a fire line, then went on to attack an enemy bunker system with a machine gun. Running down the line, he destroyed five enemy bunkers with hand grenades. His gallant actions and dedicated devotion to duty, without regard for his own life, were in keeping with the highest traditions of military service and reflect great credit upon himself, his unit, and the United States Army.

Action Date: Vietnam War Service: Army Division: 101st Airborne Division

Kellogg's major decorations and badges include:

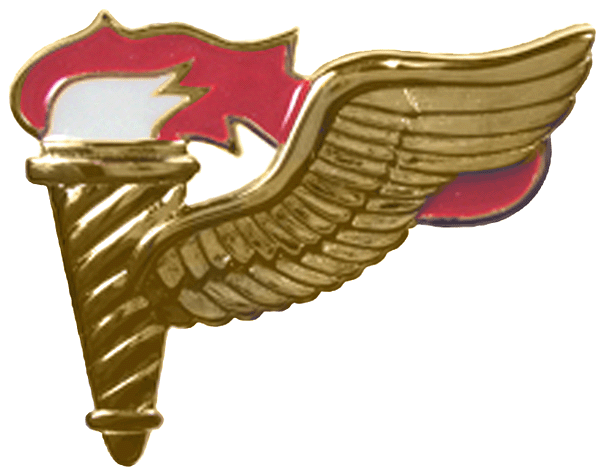

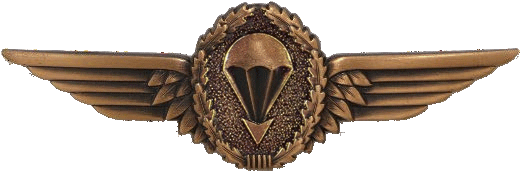

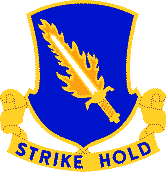

Top	Combat Infantryman Badge		
1st row	Army Distinguished Service Medal		
2nd row	Silver Star Medal	Defense Superior Service Medal	Legion of Merit w/ one oak leaf cluster
3rd row	Bronze Star Medal w/ "V" device and four oak leaf clusters	Defense Meritorious Service Medal	Meritorious Service Medal
4th row	Air Medal w/ "V" device and bronze award numeral 4	Joint Service Commendation Medal	Army Commendation Medal w/ four oak leaf clusters
5th row	Army Achievement Medal	Department of Defense Medal for Distinguished Public Service	National Defense Service Medal w/ two service stars
6th row	Armed Forces Expeditionary Medal w/ Arrowhead device	Vietnam Service Medal w/ seven service stars	Southwest Asia Service Medal w/ two service stars
7th row	Gallantry Cross (Vietnam) w/ two gold stars	Medal of National Defense in bronze (Cambodia)	Bundeswehr Gold Cross of Honour (Germany)
8th row	Vietnam Campaign Medal w/ '60- device	Kuwait Liberation Medal (Saudi Arabia)	Kuwait Liberation Medal (Kuwait)
Citations	Joint Meritorious Unit Award		
Citations	Army Meritorious Unit Commendation	Republic of Vietnam Gallantry Cross Unit Award	Republic of Vietnam Civil Actions Medal Unit Award
Badges	Master Parachutist Badge	Military Freefall Parachutist Badge	Pathfinder Badge
Badges	Special Forces Tab	Ranger tab	German Parachutist Badge in bronze
Badges	Office of the Joint Chiefs of Staff Identification Badge	Army Staff Identification Badge	504th Infantry Regiment Distinctive Unit Insignia

== See also ==
- Timeline of investigations into Trump and Russia (2019)

Political offices
Preceded by Michael Flynn	United States National Security Advisor; Acting; 2017	Succeeded by H. R. McMaster
