= Chief of Staff to the United States Secretary of State =

Supporting staff to the United States Secretary of State

Chief of Staff to the Secretary of State
- Seal of the United States Department of State
- Incumbent; Matt Rhodes since May 26, 2026
- Appointer: United States Secretary of State
- Website: State Department Description

The chief of staff to the secretary of state is the coordinator of the supporting staff and primary aide to the United States secretary of state. Matt Rhodes is serving as chief of staff since May 26, 2026 of the second Trump administration.

== List of chiefs of staff to the secretary of state ==
- Elaine Shocas (1997 – 2001)
- Lawrence Wilkerson (2002 – January 2005)
- Brian Gunderson (January 28, 2005 – January 20, 2009)
- Cheryl Mills (January 21, 2009 – February 1, 2013)
- David Wade (February 1, 2013 – March 8, 2015)
- Jonathan Finer (March 8, 2015 – January 20, 2017)
- Margaret Peterlin (February 12, 2017 – March 31, 2018)
- Suzy George (January 20, 2021 – January 20, 2025)
- Mike Needham (January 20, 2025 – September 15, 2025)
- Daniel Holler (September 19, 2025 – May 26, 2026)
- Matt Rhodes (May 26, 2026 – present)
