= United States Department of State =

Executive department of the U.S. federal government

- Seal of the Department of State

- Flag of the Department of State

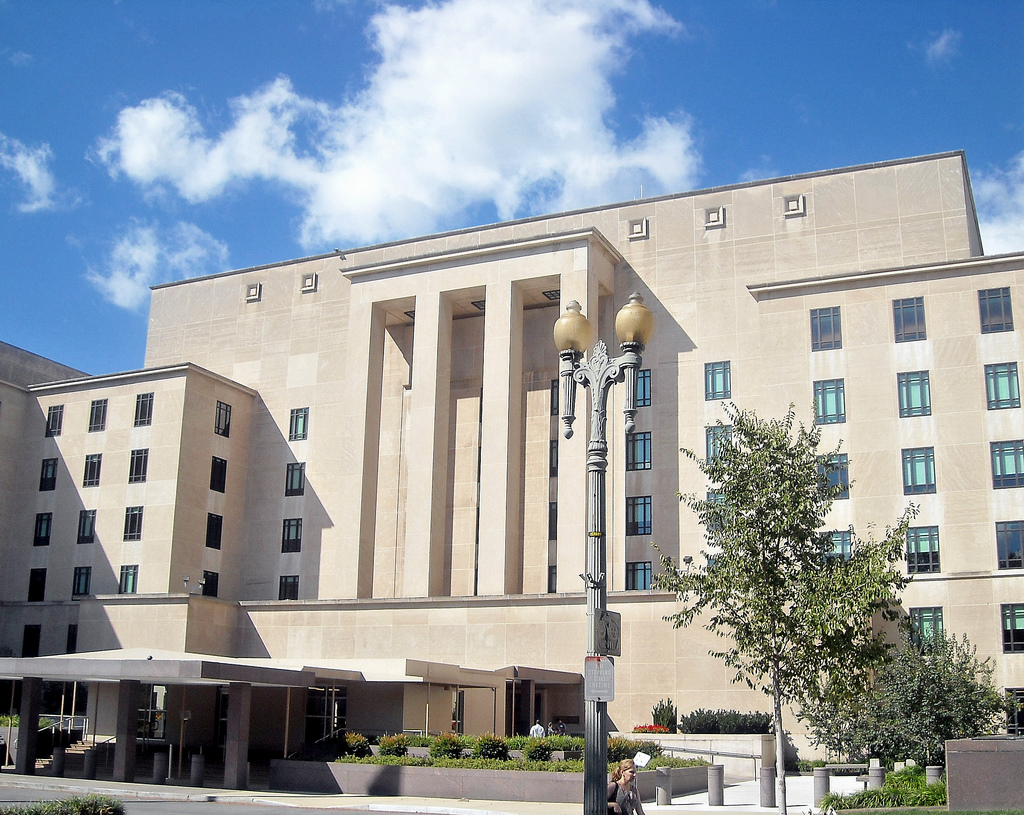
- Department of State Headquarters (2008)

Agency overview
- Formed: July 27, 1789; 237 years ago
- Preceding agency: Department of Foreign Affairs
- Type: Executive department
- Jurisdiction: U.S. federal government
- Headquarters: Harry S Truman Building, Northwest, Washington, D.C., U.S.; 38°53′39″N 77°2′54″W
- Employees: 80,214 (total); 14,399 Foreign Service employees 12,831 Civil Service employees 50,703 local employees
- Annual budget: USD 58 billion (FY 2025)
- Secretary responsible: Marco Rubio
- Deputy Secretaries responsible: Christopher Landau, Deputy Secretary of State; Michael Rigas, Deputy Secretary for Management and Resources
- Website: state.gov

The United States Department of State (DOS), or simply the State Department, is an executive department of the U.S. federal government responsible for the country's foreign policy and relations. Equivalent to the ministry of foreign affairs of other countries, its primary duties are advising the U.S. president on international relations, administering diplomatic missions, negotiating international treaties and agreements, protecting citizens abroad, and representing the U.S. at the United Nations. The department is headquartered in the Harry S Truman Building, a few blocks from the White House, in the Foggy Bottom neighborhood of Washington, D.C.; "Foggy Bottom" is thus sometimes used as a metonym.

Established in 1789 as the first administrative arm of the U.S. executive branch, the State Department is considered among the most powerful and prestigious executive agencies. It is headed by the U.S. secretary of state, who reports directly to the U.S. president and is a member of the Cabinet. Analogous to a foreign minister, the secretary of state serves as the federal government's chief diplomat and representative abroad, and is the first Cabinet official in the order of precedence and in the presidential line of succession. The position is currently held by Marco Rubio, who was appointed by President Donald Trump and confirmed by the U.S. Senate on January 20, 2025, by a vote of 99–0.

As of 2024, the State Department maintains 271 diplomatic posts worldwide, second only to the Ministry of Foreign Affairs of China. It also manages the U.S. Foreign Service, provides diplomatic training to U.S. officials and military personnel, exercises partial jurisdiction over immigration, and provides various services to Americans, such as issuing passports and visas, posting foreign travel advisories, and advancing commercial ties abroad. The department administers the oldest U.S. civilian intelligence agency, the Bureau of Intelligence and Research (INR), and maintains a law enforcement arm, the Diplomatic Security Service (DSS).

== History ==
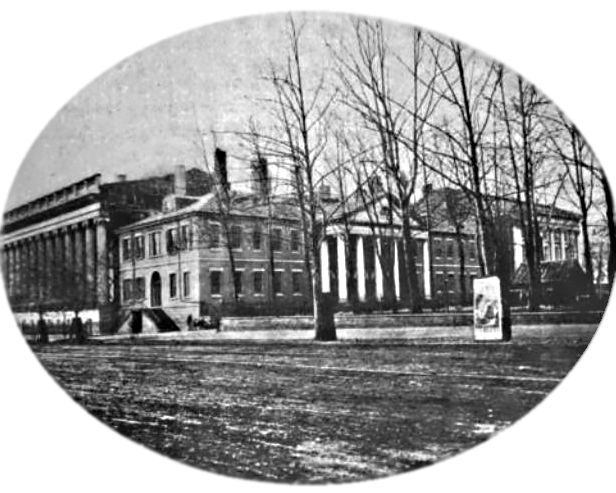
Old State Department building in Washington, D.C., c. 1865

=== Eighteenth century ===
The Articles of Confederation did not designate a separate executive branch of the government. Foreign affairs were delegated to the Committee of Secret Correspondence by the Congress of the Confederation in 1775, based on the Committee of Correspondence that was used by the colony of Massachusetts to communicate with the other colonies. The Committee of Secret Correspondence was renamed the Committee of Foreign Affairs in 1777. In 1781, the Department of Foreign Affairs was established as a permanent body to replace the Committee of Foreign Affairs, and the office of secretary of foreign affairs was established to lead the department.

The U.S. Constitution, drafted September 1787 and ratified the following year, gave the president responsibility for conducting the federal government's affairs with foreign states. To that end, on July 21, 1789, the First Congress approved legislation to reestablish the Department of Foreign Affairs under the new government, which President George Washington signed into law on July 27, making the department the first federal agency to be created under the new Constitution. This legislation remains the basic law of the Department of State.

In September 1789, additional legislation changed the name of the agency to the Department of State and assigned it a variety of domestic duties, including managing the United States Mint, keeping the Great Seal of the United States, and administering the census. President Washington signed the new legislation on September 15. Most of these domestic duties gradually were transferred to various federal departments and agencies established in the 19th century. However, the secretary of state still retains a few domestic responsibilities, such as serving as keeper of the Great Seal and being the officer to whom a president or vice president wishing to resign must deliver an instrument in writing declaring the decision.

Reflecting the fledgling status of the US at the time, the Department of State under Secretary Jefferson comprised only six personnel, two diplomatic posts (in London and Paris), and 10 consular posts. When Jefferson took charge of the department, one clerk oversaw the Foreign Office and another oversaw the Home Office. Congress authorized the department to hire a chief clerk for each office in June 1790, but the offices were consolidated under a single clerk the following month. In 1793, responsibility over patents was transferred from the cabinet to the Department of State. The office of superintendent of patents was created to carry out this responsibility, but the office was not recognized by Congress until 1830.

=== Nineteenth century ===
For much of its history, the Department of State was composed of two primary administrative units: the diplomatic service, which staffed US legations and embassies, and the consular service, which was primarily responsible for promoting American commerce abroad and assisting distressed American sailors. Each service developed separately, but both lacked sufficient funding to provide for a career; consequently, appointments to either service fell on those with the financial means to sustain their work abroad. Combined with the common practice of appointing individuals based on politics or patronage, rather than merit, this led the department to largely favor those with political networks and wealth, rather than skill and knowledge.

In 1833, Secretary of State Louis McLane oversaw a major restructure of the Department of State into a formal collection of seven bureaus: the Diplomatic Bureau; the Consular Bureau; the Home Bureau; the Bureau of Archives, Laws, and Commissions; the Bureau of Pardons and Remissions, Copyrights, and the Care of the Library; the Disbursing and Superintending Bureau; and the Translating and Miscellaneous Bureau. His successor John Forsyth reduced this number to just four the following year, overseen by a chief clerk: the Diplomatic Bureau; the Consular Bureau; the Home Bureau; and the Keeper of the Archives, Translator, and Disbursing Agent.

The office of Commissioner of Patents was created in 1836. In 1842, the Department of State was required to report to Congress on foreign commercial systems, and a clerk within the department was assigned the responsibility of arranging this information. This position was established as the Superintendent of Statistics in 1854 and the Statistical Office was created within the department. In 1853, the office of Assistant Secretary of State was created to oversee the heads of each bureau.

A Commissioner of Immigration existed between 1864 and 1868. An Examiner of Claims was established in 1868 to address claims by American citizens against foreign governments, but it was abolished in 1868 and then reestablished in 1870 under the newly established Law Bureau. In 1870, Secretary of State Hamilton Fish reorganized the department into twelve bureaus: the Chief Clerk's Bureau, two Diplomatic Bureaus, two Consular Bureaus, the Law Bureau, the Bureau of Accounts, the Statistical Bureau, the Bureau of Translations, the Bureau of Pardons and Commissions, the Bureau of Domestic Records, and the Passport Bureau. The bureaus of law, translations, and domestic records each consisted of a single person responsible for that duty. A mail division was established in 1872 and the office of Keeper of Rolls was made independent of the Chief Clerk's Bureau in 1873.

Congress legally recognized the bureau system and provided official salaries for some bureau positions in 1873. Following Congressional recognition, several acts of Congress modified the structure of the bureaus between 1874 and 1882. At the end of the nineteenth century, the department consisted of the Chief Clerk's Bureau, the Diplomatic Bureau, the Consular Bureau, the Bureau of Accounts, the Bureau of Foreign Commerce, the Bureau of Appointments, and the Bureau of Archives. Other offices, such as that of translator, also operated separately from the bureau system.

=== Twentieth century ===
In 1903, the Bureau of Foreign Commerce was transferred to the newly created Department of Commerce and Labor, and the bureau was replaced by an office to facilitate the transfer of information between consular offices and the new department. The Passport Bureau was restored the same year, and its name was changed to the Bureau of Citizenship in 1907. The department underwent a major reform in 1909 when Congress expanded its funding. Separate divisions were established within the Department for Latin American Affairs, Far Eastern Affairs, Near Eastern Affairs, Western European Affairs, and Information. An additional Division of Mexican Affairs was established in 1915. The Bureau of Trade Relations was abolished in 1912 and replaced by an Office of Foreign Trade Advisers, and the Office of the Adviser on Commercial Treaties was split from this office in 1916.

During World War I, the Bureau of Citizenship was tasked with vetting every person who entered or departed from the United States to ensure public safety. New branches of the Bureau of Citizenship were opened in New York and San Francisco. In the final months of World War I, the Bureau of Citizenship was split into the Division of Passport Control and the Visa Office. Other changes made during World War I include the conversion of the Division of Information into the Division of Foreign Intelligence in 1917 and the establishment of the Correspondence Bureau in 1918. The Division of Russian Affairs was established in 1919, and the Division of Political Information was established in 1920. The Department of State underwent its first major overhaul with the Rogers Act of 1924, which merged the diplomatic and consular services into the Foreign Service, a professionalized personnel system under which the secretary of state is authorized to assign diplomats abroad. An extremely difficult Foreign Service examination was also implemented to ensure highly qualified recruits, along with a merit-based system of promotions. The Rogers Act also created the Board of the Foreign Service, which advises the Secretary of State on managing the Foreign Service, and the Board of Examiners of the Foreign Service, which administers the examination process.

The post-Second World War period saw an unprecedented increase in funding and staff commensurate with the US's emergence as a superpower and its competition with the Soviet Union in the subsequent Cold War. Consequently, the number of domestic and overseas employees grew from roughly 2,000 in 1940 to over 13,000 in 1960.

In accordance with the 1984 Act to Combat International Terrorism, the U.S. State Department established the Rewards for Justice program. The Rewards For Justice program offered money as an incentive for information leading to the arrest of leaders of terrorist groups, financiers of terrorism, including any individual that abide in plotting terror attacks by cooperating with extremist groups.

In 1997, Madeleine Albright became the first woman appointed Secretary of State and the first foreign-born woman to serve in the Cabinet.

=== Present ===
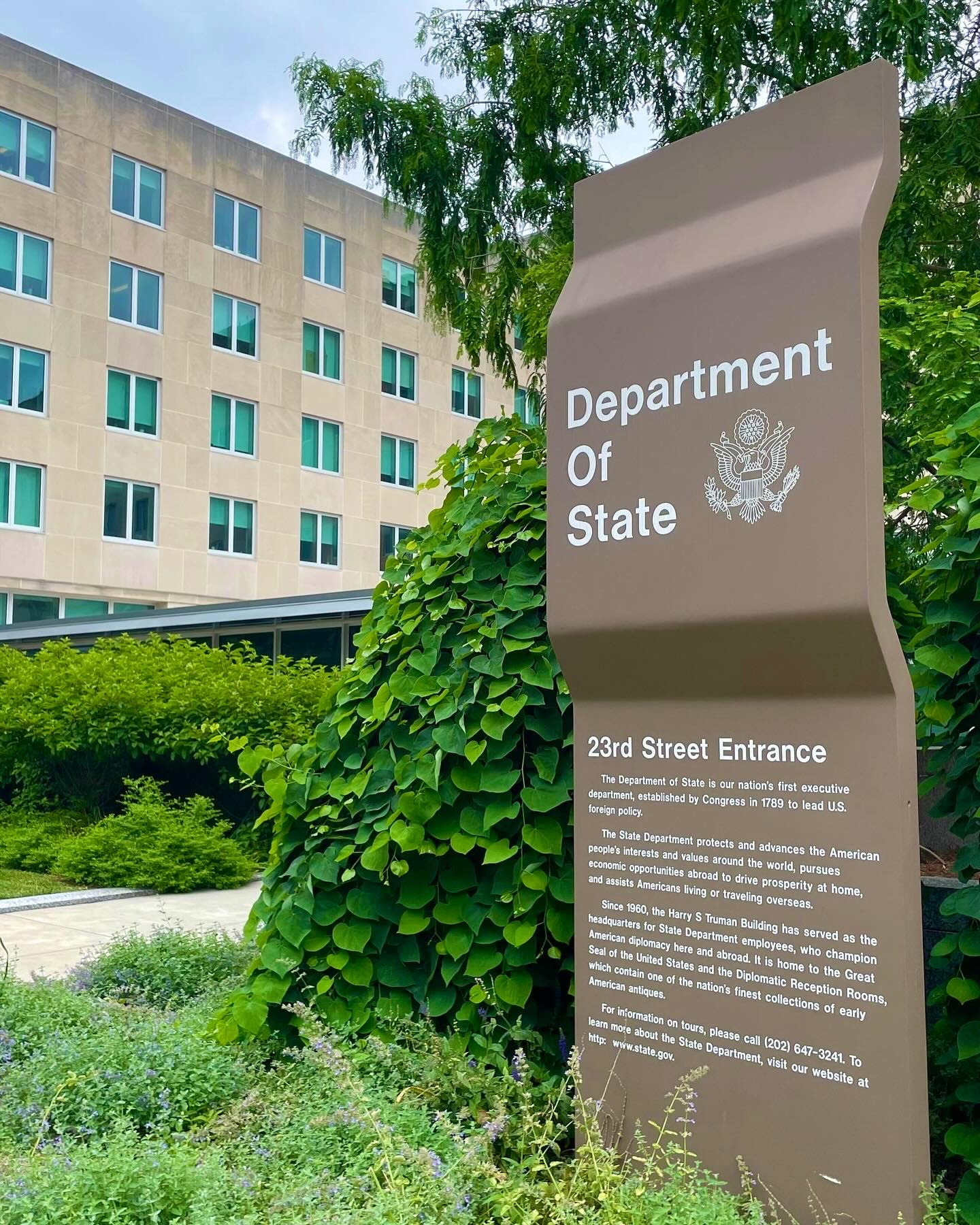
23rd street entrance

The 21st century saw the department reinvent itself in response to the rapid digitization of society and the global economy. In 2007, it launched an official blog, Dipnote, as well as a Twitter account of the same name, to engage with a global audience. Internally, it launched a wiki, Diplopedia; a suggestion forum called the Sounding Board; and a professional networking software, "Corridor". In May 2009, the Virtual Student Federal Service (VSFS) was created to provide remote internships to students. The same year, the Department of State was the fourth most desired employer for undergraduates according to BusinessWeek.

From 2009 to 2017, the State Department launched 21st Century Statecraft, with the official goal of "complementing traditional foreign policy tools with newly innovated and adapted instruments of statecraft that fully leverage the technologies of our interconnected world." The initiative was designed to utilize digital technology and the Internet to promote foreign policy goals; examples include promoting an SMS campaign to provide disaster relief to Pakistan, and sending DOS personnel to Libya to assist in developing Internet infrastructure and e-government.

Colin Powell, who led the department from 2001 to 2005, became the first African-American to hold the post; his immediate successor, Condoleezza Rice, was the second female secretary of state and the second African-American. Hillary Clinton became the third female secretary of state when she was appointed in 2009.

In 2014, the State Department began expanding into the Navy Hill Complex across 23rd Street NW from the Truman Building. A joint venture consisting of the architectural firms of Goody, Clancy and the Louis Berger Group won a $2.5 million contract in January 2014 to begin planning the renovation of the buildings on the 11.8 acres (4.8 ha) Navy Hill campus, which housed the World War II headquarters of the Office of Strategic Services and was the first headquarters of the Central Intelligence Agency.

In June 2022, the State Department launched a new transnational association, the Minerals Security Partnership.

On August 28, 2025, the State Department announced a new policy that would require the National Visa Center to schedule routine immigrant visa interviews at all overseas US embassies and consulates for immigrant visa applicants, incl. the parents of US citizens who are not present in the US but were documentarily qualified, starting on November 1, 2025. In other words, the new policy, announced on August 28, 2025 by the State Department, requires immigrant visa applicants, such as the parents of US citizens who are not present in the US but were documentarily qualified, to attend immigrant visa interviews at all overseas US embassies and consulates as of November 1, 2025.

== Duties and responsibilities ==
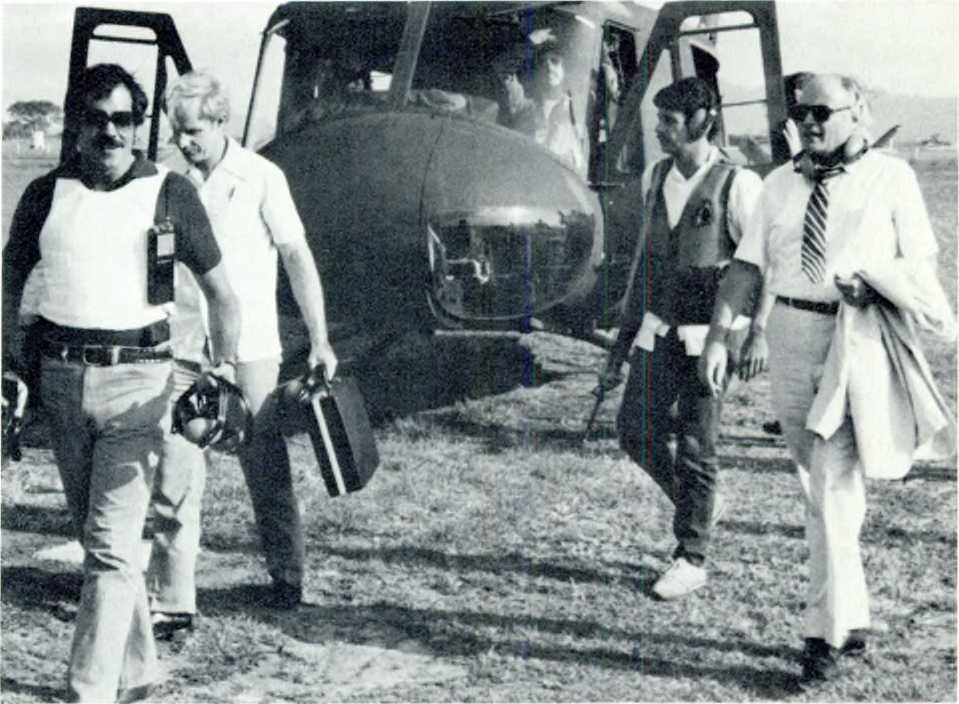
Armed Department of State security agents accompany U.S. Ambassador Deane Hinton in El Salvador in the early 1980s

The Executive Branch and the Congress have constitutional responsibilities for US foreign policy. Within the Executive Branch, the Department of State is the lead US foreign affairs agency, and its head, the secretary of state, is the president's principal foreign policy advisor. The department advances US objectives and interests in the world through its primary role in developing and implementing the president's foreign policy. It also provides an array of important services to US citizens and to foreigners seeking to visit or immigrate to the United States.

All foreign affairs activities—US representation abroad, foreign assistance programs, countering international crime, foreign military training programs, the services the department provides, and more—are paid for out of the foreign affairs budget, which represents little more than 1% of the total federal budget.

The department's core activities and purpose include:

- Protecting and assisting US citizens living or traveling abroad;
- Assisting American businesses in the international marketplace;
- Coordinating and providing support for international activities of other US agencies (local, state, or federal government), official visits overseas and at home, and other diplomatic efforts.
- Keeping the public informed about US foreign policy and relations with other countries and providing feedback from the public to administration officials.
- Providing automobile registration for non-diplomatic staff vehicles and the vehicles of diplomats of foreign countries having diplomatic immunity in the United States.

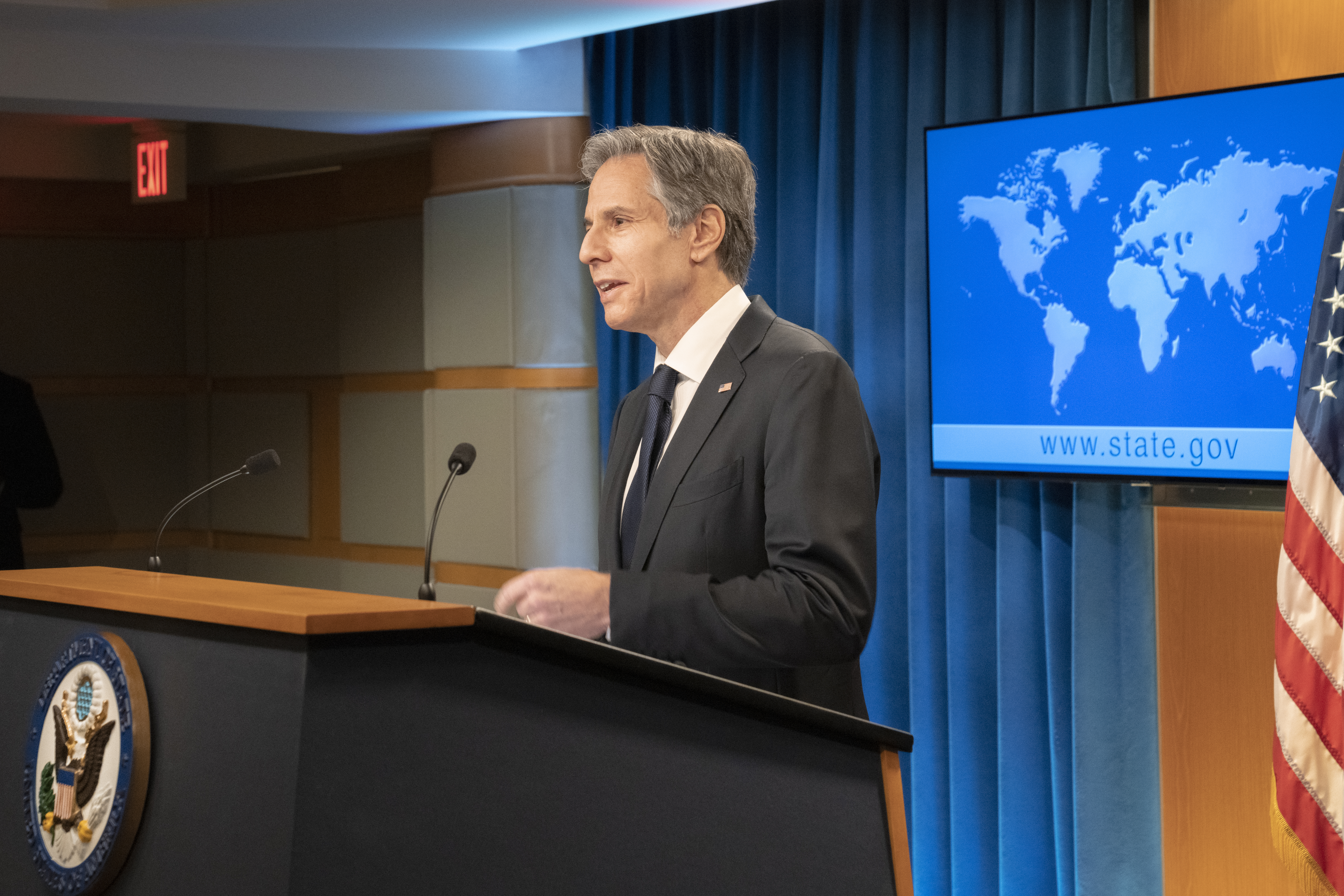
Secretary of State Antony Blinken delivers remarks to the media

The Department of State conducts these activities with a civilian workforce, and normally uses the Foreign Service personnel system for positions that require service abroad. Employees may be assigned to diplomatic missions abroad to represent the United States, analyze and report on political, economic, and social trends; adjudicate visas; and respond to the needs of US citizens abroad.

The US maintains diplomatic relations with about 180 countries and maintains relations with many international organizations, adding up to 273 posts around the world. In the United States, about 5,000 professional, technical, and administrative employees work compiling and analyzing reports from overseas, providing logistical support to posts, communicating with the American public, formulating and overseeing the budget, issuing passports and travel warnings, and more. In carrying out these responsibilities, the Department of State works in close coordination with other federal agencies, including the departments of Defense, Treasury, and Commerce. The department also consults with Congress about foreign policy initiatives and policies.

== Organization ==
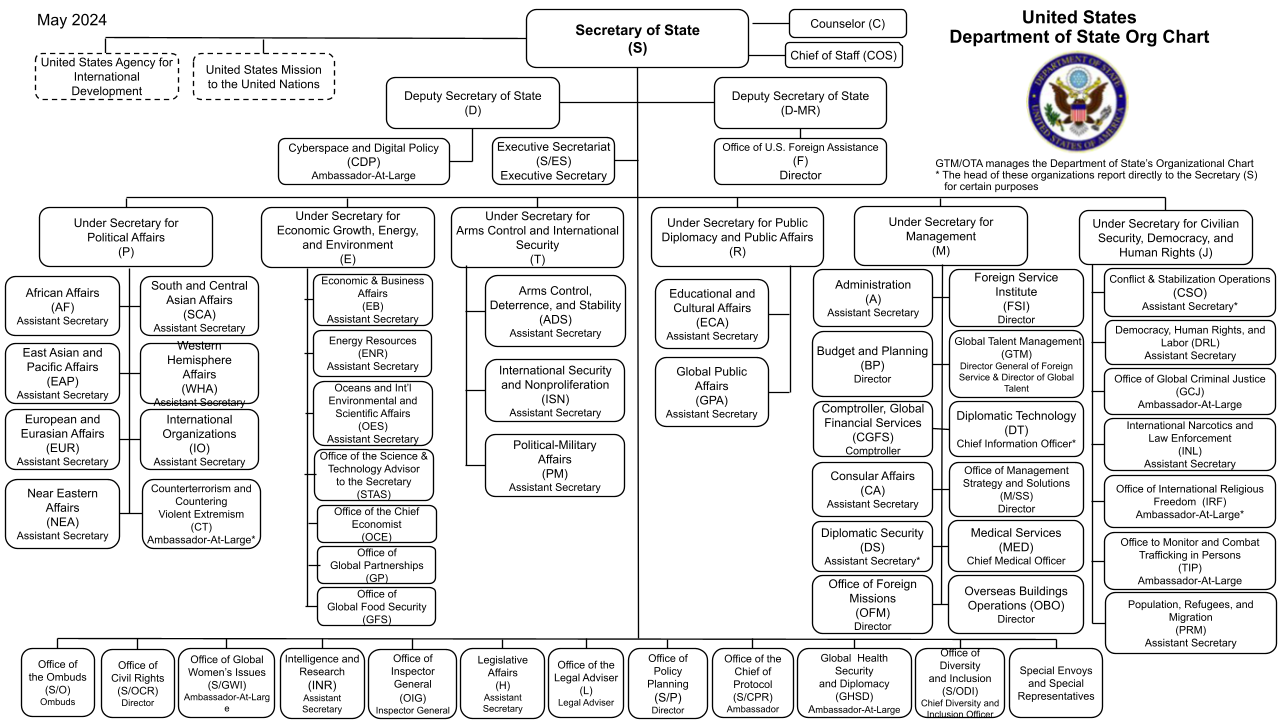
Organizational chart of the U.S. Department of State, May 2024

=== Secretary of state and leadership structure ===
The most senior official in the Department is the Secretary of State. The Secretary is the chief executive officer of the Department of State and a member of the Cabinet who answers directly to, and advises, the president of the United States. The Secretary organizes and supervises the entire department and its staff.

Immediately subordinate to the Secretary are the Deputy Secretary and the Deputy Secretary for Management and Resources, the second- and third-highest-ranking officials in the department. Ranking below the two Deputy Secretaries are six Under Secretaries, who each oversee several bureaus and offices tasked with specific areas of policy and administration. Each bureau or office, in turn, is managed by a senior official. The senior official in most bureaus is an Assistant Secretary of State, with some senior officials having other titles such as Director or Ambassador-at-Large. The final tier of senior leadership below Assistant Secretary is Deputy Assistant Secretary, of which there are several dozen. Staff below the Deputy Assistant Secretary rank are generally considered "working level."

Officials from the Secretary through the Assistant Secretaries are nominated by the President and confirmed by the Senate.

==== Staff ====
Under the Obama administration, the website of the Department of State had indicated that the State Department's 75,547 employees included 13,855 foreign service officers; 49,734 locally employed staff, whose duties are primarily serving overseas; and 10,171 predominantly domestic civil service employees.

United States State Department Organization (2025)
Secretary of State	Chief of Staff
Secretary of State	Bureau of Intelligence and Research
Secretary of State	Bureau of Legislative Affairs
Secretary of State	Office of Inspector General
Secretary of State	Office of the Legal Adviser
Secretary of State	Policy Planning Staff
Secretary of State	Counselor
Secretary of State	Executive Secretariat
Secretary of State	Office of Civil Rights and Ombudsman
Secretary of State	Office of the Chief of Protocol
Secretary of State	Special Envoys and Special Representatives
Deputy Secretary of State	Office of the Ambassador-at-Large for Arctic Affairs
Deputy Secretary of State for Management and Resources	Office of Small and Disadvantaged Business Utilization
Under Secretary of State for Political Affairs	Bureau of African Affairs
Under Secretary of State for Political Affairs	Bureau of East Asian and Pacific Affairs
Under Secretary of State for Political Affairs	Bureau of European and Eurasian Affairs
Under Secretary of State for Political Affairs	Bureau of International Organization Affairs
Under Secretary of State for Political Affairs	Bureau of Near Eastern Affairs
Under Secretary of State for Political Affairs	Bureau of South and Central Asian Affairs
Under Secretary of State for Political Affairs	Bureau of Western Hemisphere Affairs
Under Secretary of State for Economic Affairs	Bureau of Economic, Energy, and Business Affairs
Under Secretary of State for Economic Affairs	Bureau of Oceans and International Environmental and Scientific Affairs
Under Secretary of State for Economic Affairs	Bureau of Cyberspace and Digital Policy
Under Secretary of State for Economic Affairs	Office of the Chief Economist
Under Secretary of State for Arms Control and International Security Affairs	Bureau of Arms Control and Nonproliferation
Under Secretary of State for Arms Control and International Security Affairs	Bureau for International Narcotics and Law Enforcement Affairs
Under Secretary of State for Arms Control and International Security Affairs	Bureau of Political-Military Affairs
Under Secretary of State for Arms Control and International Security Affairs	Bureau of Counterterrorism
Under Secretary of State for Arms Control and International Security Affairs	Bureau of Emerging Threats
Under Secretary of State for Public Diplomacy and Public Affairs	Bureau of Educational and Cultural Affairs; *Internet Access and Training Program
Under Secretary of State for Public Diplomacy and Public Affairs	Bureau of Global Public Affairs; *Spokesperson for the United States Department of State; *Office of the Historian; *National Museum of American Diplomacy
Under Secretary of State for Public Diplomacy and Public Affairs	Office of Policy, Planning, and Resources for Public Diplomacy and Public Affairs
Under Secretary of State for Management	Bureau of Administration
Under Secretary of State for Management	Bureau of Budget and Planning
Under Secretary of State for Management	Bureau of Consular Affairs; *Office of Children's Issues
Under Secretary of State for Management	Bureau of Diplomatic Security; *U.S. Diplomatic Security Service (DSS)
Under Secretary of State for Management	Office of Foreign Missions
Under Secretary of State for Management	Bureau of Global Acquisition
Under Secretary of State for Management	Bureau of Human Resources
Under Secretary of State for Management	United States Foreign Service
Under Secretary of State for Management	Bureau of Diplomatic Technology
Under Secretary of State for Management	Bureau of Medical Services
Under Secretary of State for Management	Bureau of Overseas Buildings Operations
Under Secretary of State for Management	Director of Diplomatic Reception Rooms
Under Secretary of State for Management	National Foreign Affairs Training Center
Under Secretary of State for Foreign Assistance, Humanitarian Affairs and Religious Freedom
Under Secretary of State for Foreign Assistance, Humanitarian Affairs and Religious Freedom	Bureau of Democracy, Human Rights, and Labor
Under Secretary of State for Foreign Assistance, Humanitarian Affairs and Religious Freedom	Bureau of Population, Refugees, and Migration
Under Secretary of State for Foreign Assistance, Humanitarian Affairs and Religious Freedom	Bureau of Global Health Security and Diplomacy
Under Secretary of State for Foreign Assistance, Humanitarian Affairs and Religious Freedom	Bureau of Disaster and Humanitarian Response
Under Secretary of State for Foreign Assistance, Humanitarian Affairs and Religious Freedom	Office of Foreign Assistance Oversight

==== Other agencies ====
Since the 1996 reorganization, the administrator of the US Agency for International Development (USAID), while leading an independent agency, also reports to the secretary of state, as does the US ambassador to the United Nations.

== Headquarters ==
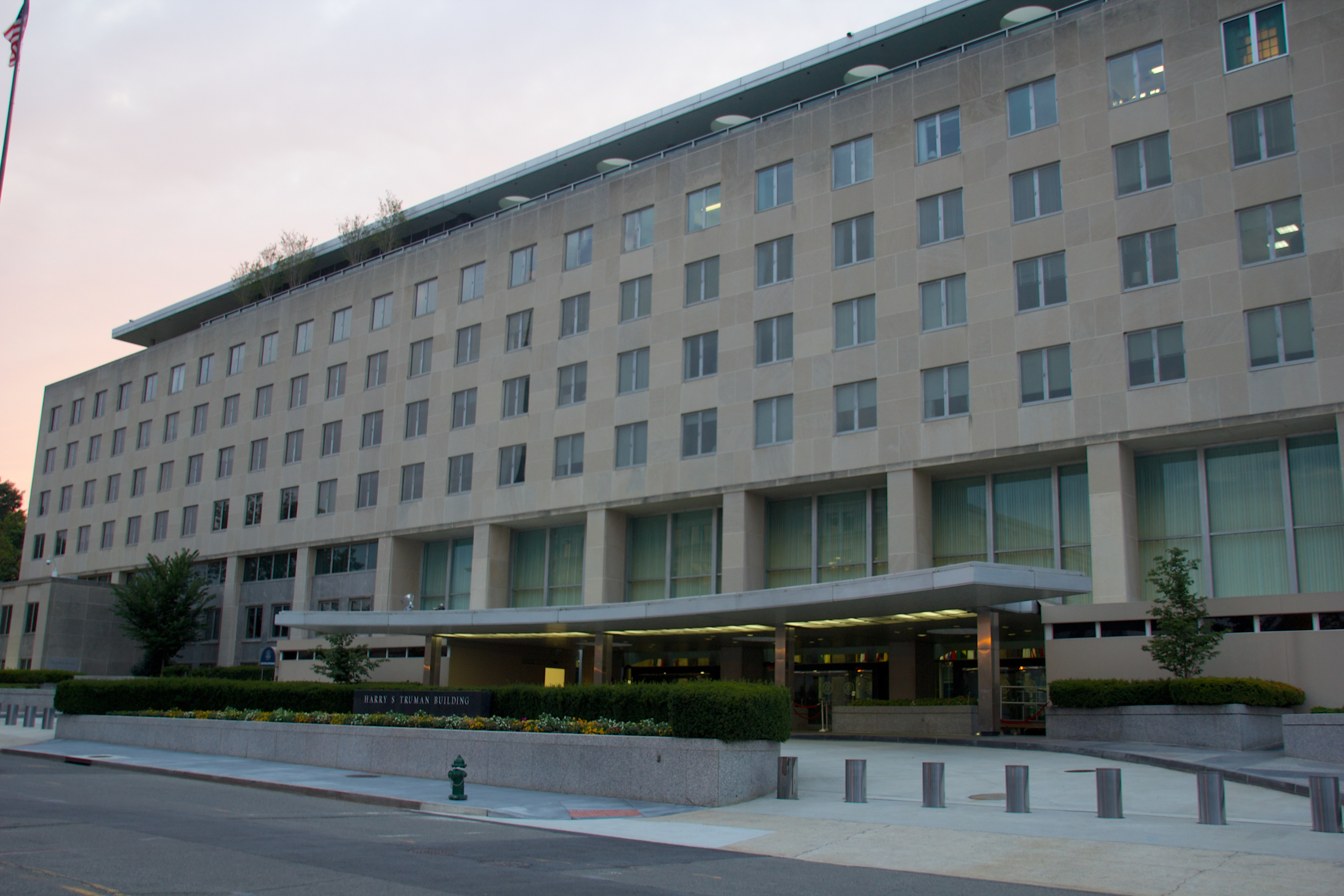
Harry S. Truman Building (formerly Main State Building), headquarters of the U.S. Department of State since May 1947

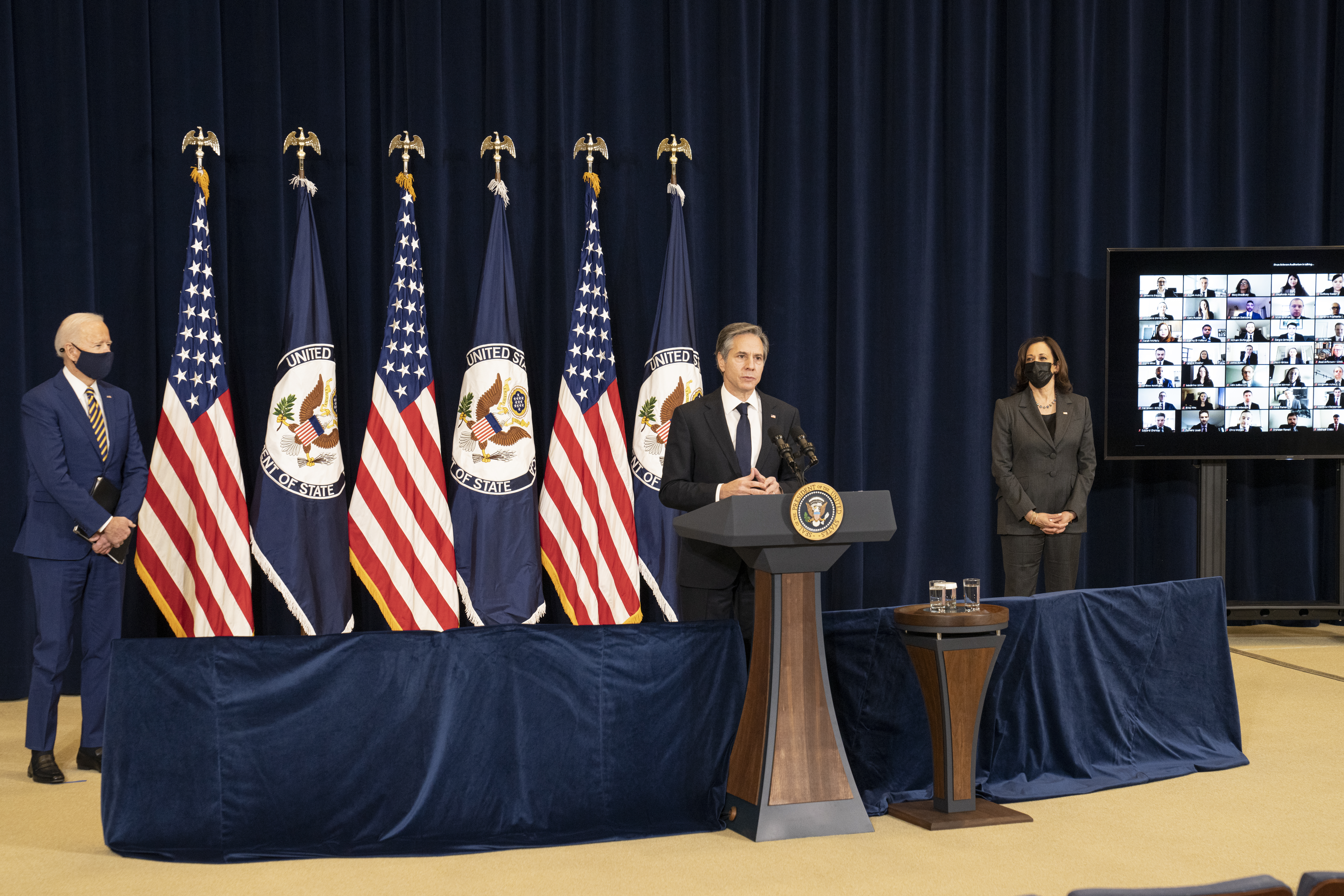
Secretary of State Antony Blinken delivers remarks with President Joe Biden and Vice President Kamala Harris at the State Department headquarters, February 2021

From 1790 to 1800, the State Department was headquartered in Philadelphia, the national capital at the time. It occupied a building at Church and Fifth Street. (Note: For a short period, during which a yellow fever epidemic ravaged the city, it resided in the New Jersey State House in Trenton, New Jersey.) In 1800, it moved from Philadelphia to Washington, D.C., where it briefly occupied the Treasury Building and then the Seven Buildings at 19th Street and Pennsylvania Avenue.

The State Department moved several times throughout the capital in the ensuing decades, including six buildings in September 1800; the War Office Building west of the White House the following May; the Treasury Building once more from September 1819 to November 1866; (Note: Except for a period between September 1814 to April 1816, during which it occupied a structure at G and 18th Streets NW while the Treasury Building was repaired) the Washington City Orphan Home from November 1866 to July 1875; and the State, War, and Navy Building in 1875.

Since May 1947, the State Department has been based in the Harry S. Truman Building, which originally was intended to house the Department of Defense; it has since undergone several expansions and renovations, most recently in 2016. Previously known as the "Main State Building", in September 2000 it was renamed in honor of President Harry S. Truman, who was a major proponent of internationalism and diplomacy.

As the DOS is located in the Foggy Bottom neighborhood of Washington, it is sometimes metonymically referred to as "Foggy Bottom".

== Programs ==
=== Professional Fellows ===
The US Department of State has in the recent years rolled out Professional Exchange Fellows who have risen to professional ranks in their lives and are chosen by the US Embassies worldwide to be a professional fellows of the State Department spending time in the United States and interacting with their American colleagues, leadership and counterparts. Notable alumni of Professional Fellows include Edmond Fernandes, Anoka Abeyratne.

=== Fulbright Program ===
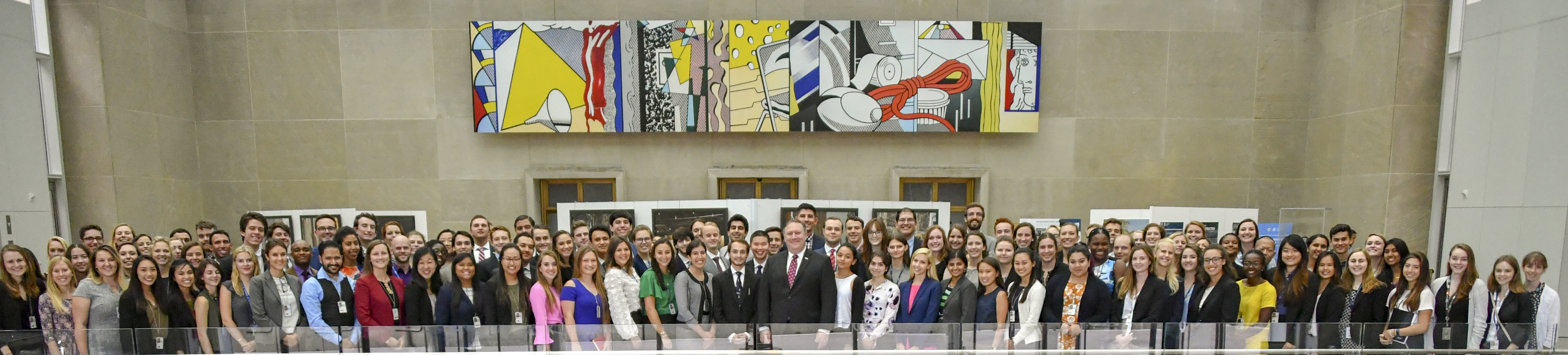
Mike Pompeo with 2018 summer interns

The Fulbright Program, including the Fulbright–Hays Program, is a program of competitive, merit-based grants for international educational exchange for students, scholars, teachers, professionals, scientists and artists, founded by United States Senator J. William Fulbright in 1946. Under the Fulbright Program, competitively selected US citizens may become eligible for scholarships to study, conduct research, or exercise their talents abroad; and citizens of other countries may qualify to do the same in the United States. The program was established to increase mutual understanding between the people of the United States and other countries through the exchange of persons, knowledge, and skills.

The Fulbright Program provides 8,000 grants annually to undertake graduate study, advanced research, university lecturing, and classroom teaching. In the 2015–16 cycle, 17% and 24% of American applicants were successful in securing research and English Teaching Assistance grants, respectively. However, selectivity and application numbers vary substantially by country and by type of grant. For example, grants were awarded to 30% of Americans applying to teach English in Laos and 50% of applicants to do research in Laos. In contrast, 6% of applicants applying to teach English in Belgium were successful compared to 16% of applicants to do research in Belgium.

The US Department of State's Bureau of Educational and Cultural Affairs sponsors the Fulbright Program from an annual appropriation from the U.S. Congress. Additional direct and in-kind support comes from partner governments, foundations, corporations, and host institutions both in and outside the US The Fulbright Program is administered by cooperating organizations like the Institute of International Education. It operates in over 160 countries around the world. In each of 49 countries, a bi-national Fulbright Commission administers and oversees the Fulbright Program. In countries without a Fulbright Commission but that have an active program, the Public Affairs Section of the US Embassy oversees the Fulbright Program. More than 360,000 persons have participated in the program since it began. Fifty-four Fulbright alumni have won Nobel Prizes; eighty-two have won Pulitzer Prizes.

=== National Security Language Initiative ===
The National Security Language Initiative (NSLI-Y) is a US Department of State ECA competitive merit-based scholarship to develop the foreign language skills of American high school students in eight critical-need languages. Korean, Mandarin, Russian, Arabic, Hindi, Bahasa Indonesian, Tajiki, and Turkish are all taught in summer and academic year programs abroad, as well as in online classes.

=== Jefferson Science Fellows Program ===
The Jefferson Science Fellows Program was established in 2003 by the DoS to establish a new model for engaging the American academic science, technology, engineering and medical communities in the formulation and implementation of US foreign policy.

The Fellows (as they are called, if chosen for the program) are paid around $50,000 during the program and can earn special bonuses of up to $10,000. The program's intent is to equip Fellows with awareness of procedural intricacies of the Department of State/USAID, to help with its daily operations. The program is applied for, follows a process starting in August, and takes about a year to learn a candidate's ranking results. Awards are not solely achievement based, but intelligence and writing skills should support one's suitability for the position as the committee determines. A candidate applies for the program online, which entails submitting a curriculum vitae, a statement of interest and a written essay. Opportunity is provided to upload letters of recommendations and nominations to support one's application.

=== Franklin Fellows Program ===
The Franklin Fellows Program was established in 2006 by the DoS to bring in mid-level executives from the private sector and non-profit organizations to advise the department and to work on projects.

Fellows may also work with other government entities, including the Congress, White House, and executive branch agencies, including the Department of Defense, Department of Commerce, and Department of Homeland Security. The program is named in honor of Benjamin Franklin, and aims to attract mid-career professionals to enrich and expand the department's capabilities. Unlike the Jefferson Science Fellows Program, a Franklin Fellowship is a year-long volunteer position for which one may obtain sponsor support or participate out of personal resources. Participation areas assigned to Franklin Fellows are determined by several factors, including issues of priority to the country as well as a candidate's degree of career seniority and personal interests.

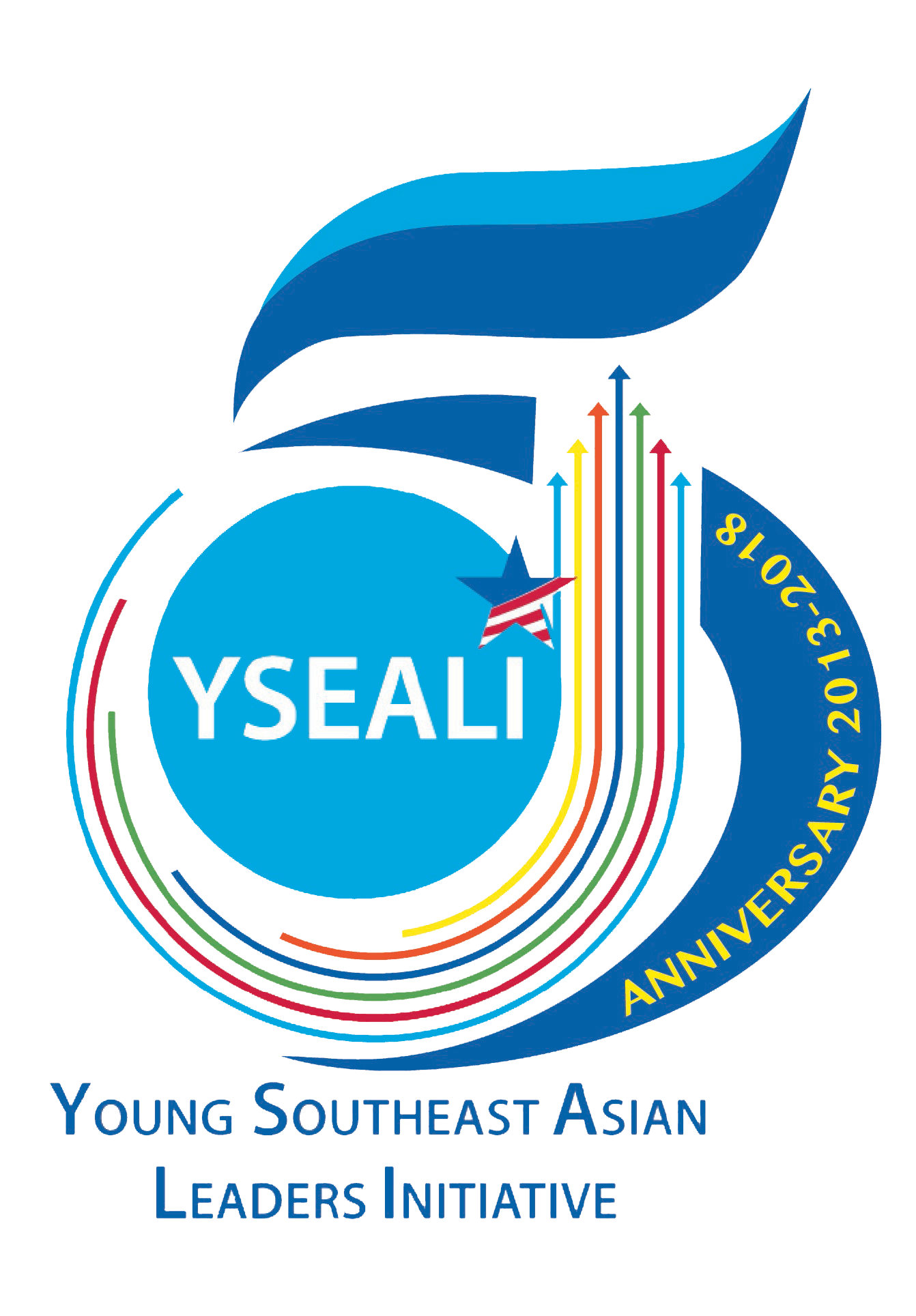
YSEALI 5th year anniversary logo

=== Young Southeast Asian Leaders Initiative (YSEALI) ===
See also Young Southeast Asian Leaders Initiative

The Young Southeast Asian Leaders Initiative (YSEALI) (pronounced /waɪsiːˈliː/) is a program of the DoS for emerging leaders from Southeast Asia. The program was launched by President Barack Obama in Manila in December 2013 as a way to strengthen leadership development, networking, and cultural exchange among emerging leaders within the age range of 18 to 35 years old from the 10 member-states of the Association of Southeast Asian Nations and Timor Leste.

YSEALI's programs include competitive exchange fellowship programs to the United States, virtual and on-ground workshops within Southeast Asia, and seed grant funding opportunities. The programs fall under the key core themes of civic engagement, sustainable development, economic development, governance, and the environment.

Notable alumni of YSEALI include Vico Sotto, Syed Saddiq, Carrie Tan, and Lee Chean Chung.

=== Young African Leaders Initiative (YALI) ===
See also Young African Leaders Initiative

The Young African Leaders Initiative (YALI) is a program of the DoS for emerging young leaders in Africa. It was begun in 2010 by President Barack Obama to promote education and networking among emerging African leaders through the Mandela Washington Fellowship which brings them to study in the United States for six weeks, with follow-up resources, and student exchange programs. In 2014, the program was expanded to include four regional "leadership centers" in Ghana, Kenya, Senegal and South Africa.

=== KL-YES program ===
The Kennedy-Lugar Youth Exchange and Study (KL-YES) program was established in 2002 to promote educational and cultural exchange between the United States and countries with significant Muslim populations. It offers high school students to study in the United States for an academic year, fostering cultural understanding and leadership skills. KL-YES includes a selective process, pre-departure orientations, academic coursework, cultural activities, and community service. The YES Abroad program is a reciprocal initiative that allows American students to study abroad in participating countries. Both programs aim to build global connections and mutual understanding.

=== Alumni TIES ===
The State Department sponsors Alumni Thematic International Exchange Seminars (Alumni TIES) exclusively for alumni of U.S. government-sponsored exchange programs. Alumni TIES is an opportunity for exchange alumni to learn about key regional issues, receive training, collaborate with fellow alumni, and apply for small grants to implement projects in their home communities. Example of one such Alumni TIES conducted by the US Embassy in Thailand was on public health and climate crisis.

=== Diplomats in Residence ===
Diplomats in Residence are career Foreign Service officers and specialists located throughout the US who provide guidance and advice on careers, internships, and fellowships to students and professionals in communities they serve. Diplomats in Residence are located in 16 population-based regions throughout the United States.

== Global Health Security ==
The State Department administers a number of programs to support global health through the Bureau of Global Health Security and Diplomacy. The Bureau is the principal body responsible for the State Department's global health programs. This includes programs such as the President's Emergency Plan for AIDS Relief, where the bureau plans to ameliorate the HIV/AIDS pandemic by 2030. One recent initiative launched by the Department of State to support global health communication and coordinated response is the Foreign Ministry Channel "for foreign ministries to focus diplomatic attention and action on critical global health security."

== Military components ==
=== Department of State Department Air Wing ===
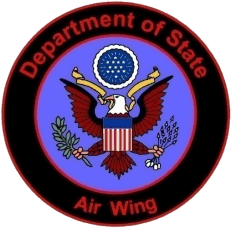
Logo of the "Air Wing" of The Bureau of International Narcotics and Law Enforcement Affairs (INL) - Office of Aviation, U.S. Department of State

In 1978, the Bureau for International Narcotics and Law Enforcement Affairs (INL) formed an office to use excess military and government aircraft to support counter-narcotics operations of foreign states. The first aircraft used was a crop duster used to eradicate illicit crops in Mexico in cooperation with local authorities. The separate Air Wing was established in 1986 as use of aviation assets grew in the war on drugs.

After the September 11 attacks and the subsequent war on terror, the Air Wing went on to expand its operations from mainly anti-narcotics operations to providing security support for United States nationals and interests, primarily in Afghanistan and Pakistan. Safe transports for various diplomatic missions were undertaken, requiring acquisition of larger aircraft, such as Sikorsky S-61, Boeing Vertol CH-46, Beechcraft King Air and de Havilland DHC-8-300. In 2011, the Air Wing was operating over 230 aircraft around the world, the main missions still being counter narcotics and transportation of state officials.

=== Naval Support Unit: Department of State ===
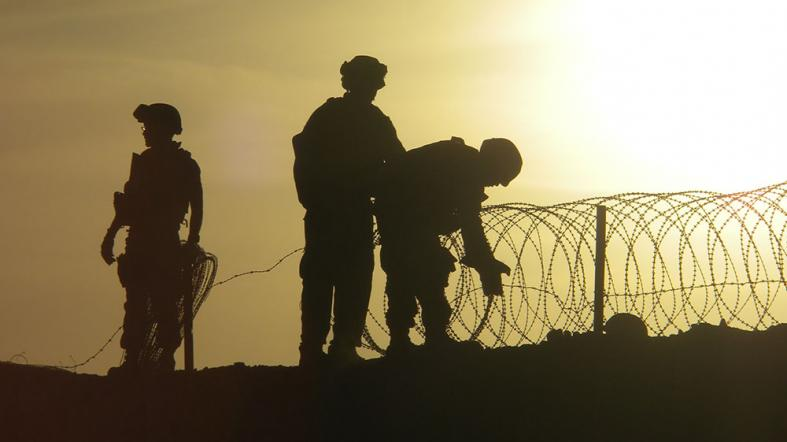
Naval Support Unit Seabees securing a diplomatic compound in December 2010

In 1964, at the height of the Cold War, Seabees were assigned to the State Department after listening devices were found in the Embassy of the United States in Moscow; this initial unit was called the "Naval Mobile Construction Battalion FOUR, Detachment November". The U.S. had just constructed a new embassy in Warsaw, and the Seabees were dispatched to locate "bugs". This led to the creation of the Naval Support Unit in 1966, which was made permanent two years later. That year William Darrah, a Seabee of the support unit, is credited with saving the U.S. Embassy in Prague, Czechoslovakia from a potentially disastrous fire. In 1986, "as a result of reciprocal expulsions ordered by Washington and Moscow" Seabees were sent to "Moscow and Leningrad to help keep the embassy and the consulate functioning".

The Support Unit has a limited number of special billets for select NCOs, E-5 and above. These Seabees are assigned to the Department of State and attached to Diplomatic Security. Those chosen can be assigned to the Regional Security Officer of a specific embassy or be part of a team traveling from one embassy to the next. Duties include the installation of alarm systems, CCTV cameras, electromagnetic locks, safes, vehicle barriers, and securing compounds. They can also assist with the security engineering in sweeping embassies (electronic counter-intelligence). They are tasked with new construction or renovations in security sensitive areas and supervise private contractors in non-sensitive areas. Due to diplomatic protocol the Support Unit is required to wear civilian clothes most of the time they are on duty and receive a supplemental clothing allowance for this. The information regarding this assignment is very scant, but State Department records in 1985 indicate department security had 800 employees, plus 1,200 U.S. Marines and 115 Seabees. That Seabee number is roughly the same today.

=== Army Reserve Counter Terrorism Unit ===
Headquartered on Navy Hill, across the street from the Harry S. Truman building, ARCTU is a component of the Army Reserve funded and staffed by Military Intelligence Readiness Command's National Intelligence Support Group but under operational control of the Bureau of Counterterrorism. It is also a senior member of Diplomatic Security's Foreign Emergency Support Team, which responds to global crises on short notice. Little information is available on the unit, though they often wear civilian clothes like other military workers for the State Department mission.

== Expenditures ==
In FY 2010 the Department of State, together with "Other International Programs" (such as USAID), had a combined projected discretionary budget of $51.7 billion. The United States Federal Budget for Fiscal Year 2010, entitled 'A New Era of Responsibility', specifically 'Imposes Transparency on the Budget' for the Department of State.

The end-of-year FY 2010 DoS Agency Financial Report, approved by Secretary Clinton on November 15, 2010, showed actual total costs for the year of $27.4 billion. Revenues of $6.0 billion, $2.8 billion of which were earned through the provision of consular and management services, reduced total net cost to $21.4 billion.

Total program costs for 'Achieving Peace and Security' were $7.0 billion; 'Governing Justly and Democratically', $0.9 billion; 'Investing in People', $4.6 billion; 'Promoting Economic Growth and Prosperity', $1.5 billion; 'Providing Humanitarian Assistance', $1.8 billion; 'Promoting International Understanding', $2.7 billion; 'Strengthening Consular and Management Capabilities', $4.0 billion; 'Executive Direction and Other Costs Not Assigned', $4.2 billion.

=== Audit of expenditures ===
The Department of State's independent auditors are Kearney & Company. Since in FY 2009 Kearney & Company qualified its audit opinion, noting material financial reporting weaknesses, the DoS restated its 2009 financial statements in 2010. In its FY 2010 audit report, Kearney & Company provided an unqualified audit opinion while noting significant deficiencies, of controls in relation to financial reporting and budgetary accounting, and of compliance with a number of laws and provisions relating to financial management and accounting requirements. In response, the DoS Chief Financial Officer observed that "the Department pursues a commitment to financial integrity, transparency, and accountability that is the equal of any large multi-national corporation."

== Central Foreign Policy File ==
Since 1973 the primary record keeping system of the Department of State is the Central Foreign Policy File. It consists of copies of official telegrams, airgrams, reports, memorandums, correspondence, diplomatic notes, and other documents related to foreign relations. Over 1,000,000 records spanning the time period from 1973 to 1979 can be accessed online from the National Archives and Records Administration.

== Freedom of Information Act processing performance ==
In the 2015 Center for Effective Government analysis of 15 federal agencies which receive the most Freedom of Information Act (FOIA) (using 2012 and 2013 data), the State Department was the lowest performer, earning an "F" by scoring only 37 out of a possible 100 points, unchanged from 2013. The State Department's score was dismal due to its extremely low processing score of 23 percent, which was completely out of line with any other agency's performance.

== See also ==
- Awards of the United States Department of State
- Diplomatic missions of the United States
- Diplomatic Reception Rooms
- Five Nations Passport Group
- Foreign policy of the United States
- History of United States foreign policy
- Timeline of United States diplomatic history
- United States Foreign Service
- Office of the Coordinator of Inter-American Affairs
- Foreign Affairs Manual
- International affairs budget of the United States

== Primary sources ==
- The Foreign Service Journal, complete issues of the Consular Bureau's monthly news magazine, 1919-present
- @StateDept — official departmental X (former Twitter) account
- State.gov — official departmental website
- 2017—2021 State.gov — Archived website and diplomatic records — Trump administration
- 2009—2017 State.gov — Archived website and diplomatic records — Obama administration
