= David F. Gordon =

24th Director of Policy Planning
- In office June 27, 2007 – January 20, 2009
- President: George W. Bush
- Preceded by: Stephen D. Krasner
- Succeeded by: Anne-Marie Slaughter

Personal details
- Education: B.A., Bowdoin College; Ph.D., University of Michigan
- Occupation: Political scientist, economist
- Website: David Gordon: Eurasia Group

David F. Gordon was the Head of Research at Eurasia Group, the political risk consultancy. He was previously the U.S. State Department's Director of Policy Planning, where he held a rank equivalent to a United States Assistant Secretary of State.

== Education ==
Gordon, a 1971 graduate of Bowdoin College, who received a philosophiae doctor in political science and economics from the University of Michigan in 1981, began teaching at the University of Michigan and Michigan State University in the 1980s. He has also taught at the College of William & Mary, Princeton University, Georgetown University, and the University of Nairobi.

== Career ==
Before being appointed Director of Policy Planning, he served as the Director of CIA’s Office of Transnational Issues (OTI), an office that covers a broad range of national security and foreign policy issues, and as Vice Chairman and National Intelligence Officer for Economic and Global Issues on the National Intelligence Council. He is a member of the Senior Intelligence Service of the United States.

Dr. Gordon’s background includes service as a Senior Fellow and Director at the Overseas Development Council, a senior staff member on the Foreign Affairs Committee of the U.S. House of Representatives, and as the regional economic policy and democracy/governance advisor for the U.S. Agency for International Development based in Nairobi, Kenya. He was the State Department's 24th Director of Policy Planning, where he was in charge of the department's internal think tank, the Policy Planning Staff.

In January 2009, Dr. Gordon became Head of Research at Eurasia Group, the global political risk consulting firm. He is based in Washington DC.

His latest book, Managing Strategic Surprise: Lessons from Risk Management & Risk Assessment, co-edited with Ian Bremmer and Paul Bracken, was published in 2008 by Cambridge University Press.

During the 2020 presidential election, Gordon, along with over 130 other former Republican national security officials, signed a statement that asserted that President Donald Trump was unfit to serve another term, and "To that end, we are firmly convinced that it is in the best interest of our nation that Vice President Joe Biden be elected as the next President of the United States, and we will vote for him."

== Books ==
- Managing Strategic Surprise: Lessons from Risk Management & Risk Assessment, (edited with Paul Bracken and Ian Bremmer). (Cambridge University Press, 2008) ISBN 0-521-88315-6
- The United States and Africa: A Post-Cold War Perspective, (with David C. Miller, Howard Wolpe and the American Assembly). (W. W. Norton & Company, 1998) ISBN 0-393-31817-6
