= Sandra Louise Vogelgesang =

American diplomat

United States Ambassador to Nepal
- In office April 7, 1994 – July 11, 1997
- President: Bill Clinton
- Preceded by: Michael E. Malinowski
- Succeeded by: Ralph Frank

Personal details
- Born: 1942 (age 83–84)
- Spouse: Geoffrey Wolfe
- Education: Cornell University; Fletcher School of Law and Diplomacy at Tufts University

Sandra Louise Vogelgesang (born 1942) was a senior foreign service officer and policy planner for the U.S. State Department.

== Life ==
She attended Cornell University and Fletcher School of Law and Diplomacy at Tufts University. She served as a deputy assistant Secretary of State, and, from 1994 to 1997 she was U.S. Ambassador to Nepal, appointed by President Bill Clinton.

She is married to Geoffrey Wolfe.

== Writings ==
- American Dream, Global Nightmare: The Dilemma of U.S. Human Rights Policy, Norton, 1980, 272 pp, ISBN 9780393013634
- Long Dark Night of the Soul: The American Intellectual Left and the Vietnam War, HarperCollins, 1974, 249 pp, ISBN 9780060145125

Diplomatic posts
Preceded by Michael Malinowski	United States Ambassador to Nepal; 1994–1997	Succeeded by Ralph Frank
