= Fenton High School (Michigan) =

Location
- 3200 West Shiawassee Avenue; Fenton, Michigan 48430; United States; 42°47′02″N 83°44′03″W

Information
- Type: Public secondary
- Established: 1866, 1969 (current location)
- School district: Fenton Area Public Schools
- Principal: Michael Bakker
- Teaching staff: 58.51 (FTE)
- Grades: 9–12
- Enrollment: 1,048 (2023-2024)
- Student to teacher ratio: 17.91
- Colors: Orange and Black
- Athletics conference: Flint Metro League
- Nickname: Tigers
- Newspaper: Fenton InPrint
- Yearbook: Fentonian
- Website: www.fentonschools.org/o/fhs

Fenton High School is a public high school located in Fenton, Michigan, United States. In 2008 the school received International Baccalaureate (IB) Authorization. The high school has over 1,200 students.

== Athletics ==
Until 1968, Fenton High School competed in the County B League. The school then joined the Metro League.

== Notable alumni ==
- Kenny Allen (class of 2012), NCAA player for the University of Michigan, Baltimore Ravens, and CFL.
- William I. Cargo, diplomat who served as the United States Ambassador to Nepal and Director of Policy Planning
- Myles Jury, wrestler and professional mixed martial arts fighter
- Josh Thompson, NFL guard for the Atlanta Falcons
- Jill Ann Weatherwax (class of 1988), model and singer; murdered in 1998.
