= Contents of the United States diplomatic cables leak (Europe) =

Contents of the United States diplomatic cables leak has depicted Europe and related subjects extensively. The leak, which began on 28 November 2010, occurred when the website of WikiLeaks—an international new media non-profit organisation that publishes submissions of otherwise unavailable documents from anonymous news sources and news leaks—started to publish classified documents of detailed correspondence—diplomatic cables—between the United States Department of State and its diplomatic missions around the world.

== Albania ==
Guantanamo Bay detainees

After accepting five Uighur detainees from Guantánamo Bay in 2006, Sali Berisha offered to take three to six detainees extra. American diplomats portrayed his offer as "gracious, but probably extravagant... as always, the Albanians are willing to go the extra mile to assist with one of our key foreign policy priorities".

== Austria ==
Foreign policy

U.S. diplomats criticised the Austrian government—and especially Austria Chancellor Werner Faymann, and minister of defence Norbert Darabos—for the lack of interest in foreign policy. Foreign minister Michael Spindelegger is criticised for only caring about the expansion of the Austrian economy.

Secret business deals with North Korea and Iran

Further contacts between Austrian banks and Iran and North Korea are criticised. Austrian companies supplied Iran with high-tech equipment for its nuclear program. At the same time government officials helped disclose the deals by secretly passing on that information to the U.S. embassy.

== Baltic countries ==
Operation Eagle Guardian

The three Baltic countries, Estonia, Latvia and Lithuania, have been added to Poland as countries to be defended from Russia. Such plans by the U.S. and NATO were revealed by the leak of a confidential cable from U.S. Secretary of State Hillary Clinton in January 2010 that allegedly stated that this expansion of pre-existing contingency plans, known as Operation Eagle Guardian, had been approved by NATO allies. This would specifically involve American, British, German and Polish NATO divisions. The cable also warned against public discussion of the military plans for fears of unneeded increase of NATO-Russia tensions. According to Russian foreign ministry sources they were "perplexed" to learn of these plans.

== Belgium ==
Defense

Mails from the American embassy in Brussels reveal that Minister of Defence Pieter De Crem is considered by the U.S. as their best supporter in the Belgian government, unlike prime minister Yves Leterme or Johan Vande Lanotte. De Crem also asked Hillary Clinton to insist with the Belgian government for more funds for the Belgian army. The U.S. was also concerned about plans for the removal of all nuclear weapons in Kleine Brogel, but the Cabinet of De Crem reassured the Americans that these plans would be stopped in Parliament.

== Bosnia and Herzegovina ==
Office of the High Representative

- The French government pushed for the closure of the Office of the High Representative despite conditions not being met, in opposition to the U.S.
- The United Kingdom nominated Sir Emyr Jones Parry as the High Representative for Bosnia and Herzegovina.

Use of the term "genocide"

U.S. and Turkish officials pressured Haris Silajdžić, a former member of the presidency of Bosnia and Herzegovina, to ease his rhetoric and desist from using the word "genocide" in relation to Serbs.

Ahtisaari plan

Milorad Dodik, then prime minister of the Republika Srpska entity in Bosnia and Herzegovina, supported the Ahtisaari plan for the independence of Kosovo.

== Bulgaria ==
Soccer clubs owned by the Mafia

According to a cable from the U.S. Ambassador to Bulgaria from January 2010 Bulgarian soccer clubs are widely believed "to be directly or indirectly controlled by organized crime figures who use their teams as a way to legitimize themselves, launder money, and make a fast buck." The cable further notes that due to very few arrests and successful prosecutions the public has lost faith in the legitimacy of the league and stopped watching the games.

== Croatia ==
S-300 missile

A cable written by the U.S. Ambassador to Croatia Ralph Frank in November 2003 reveals the American interest in obtaining the S-300 surface-to-air missile system from Croatia. The Croatian government acquired the system in 1995, before the Operation Storm, but it was incomplete and was never operative. According to other sources, including the court testimony of arms dealer Zvonko Zubak, the system was indeed shipped to the U.S. in 2004.

== Czech Republic ==
Missile Defense

The missile defense system that America was thinking about putting in the Czech Republic would not have been able to shoot down Russian nuclear missiles.

== Denmark ==
Roj TV

Former Danish prime minister Anders Fogh Rasmussen, during a meeting with Turkish foreign ministry undersecretary Feridun Sinirlioglu, promised to shut down the controversial Denmark-based Kurdish TV-station Roj TV, in order to prevent Turkish obstruction to his appointment as Secretary General of NATO.

== France ==
Mistral-class helicopter carrier

Sarkozy's deal to sell the high-tech Mistral-class helicopter carrier model to Russia was met with criticism from US analysts, who stated that "bad political signal [which] detracted from President Sarkozy's personal engagement to resolve the Georgian crisis of 2008."

Industrial espionage

Of all countries, France conducts the most industrial espionage on European countries, causing more economic damage to the German economy than espionage from China or Russia.

== Germany ==
Data sharing

A number of cables from the U.S. embassy in Berlin reveal the U.S. concern on Germany's position in the SWIFT-, TFTP- and the bilateral U.S.–Germany data sharing agreement. A revealing cable from December 2009 (09BERLIN1528) describes how German Minister of the Interior Thomas de Maizière overruled Justice Minister Sabine Leutheusser-Schnarrenberger and abstained from voting at the November 30 Committee of Permanent Representatives vote in Brussels on an interim U.S.–EU agreement to continue the Terrorist Finance Tracking Program (TFTP).

Guido Westerwelle

U.S. embassy personnel were very critical of German foreign minister Guido Westerwelle. American diplomats have criticized his ineffectiveness, stating that "he's no Genscher". An embassy cable sent from Berlin on 22 September 2009 describes Westerwelle as having an "exuberant personality" and calling him an "enigma" who "remains sceptical about the US".

Khalid El-Masri

American officials warned Germany in 2007 not to enforce arrest warrants for CIA officers involved in a bungled operation in which Khalid El-Masri, an innocent German citizen with the same name as a suspected militant, was mistakenly kidnapped and held for months in Afghanistan.

Cabinet Merkel II

It is revealed that the U.S. had an informant in the coalition talks between the Christian Democratic Union (CDU) and Free Democratic Party (FDP) for Cabinet Merkel II. Following the leak, FDP chairman Westerwelle's chief of staff Helmut Metzner admitted that he gave regular information to the U.S. embassy.

== Iceland ==
WikiLeaks played a major role during the 2008–2012 Icelandic financial crisis when Kristinn Hrafnsson, after being forbidden to mention leaks related to Kaupthing, put the wikileaks.org address on screen on the TV news. The alleged first document sent by Chelsea Manning was a cable sent by the U.S. embassy in Reykjavík dated 13 January 2010, commenting on IceSave, and thereafter known as REYKJAVIK13.

== Ireland ==
Shannon Airport and the United States armed forces

A 2006 memo on Ireland featured when on 1 December 2010 it was revealed that American diplomats discussed the Irish government's attempts to oppose American military use of Shannon Airport before Ireland's 2007 general election. After this release Amnesty International asked the Irish government to tighten its legislation to control the use of Irish airspace by the Americans. Colm O'Gorman, the organisation's executive director in Ireland, observed that concerns expressed by Irish citizens over the misuse of the airport by the Americans was "a problem to be managed rather than something to be taken seriously".

According to a 2006 diplomatic cable sent from the U.S. embassy in Ireland, "the Irish Government has informally begun to place constraints on US military transits" at Shannon Airport. The Irish government attempted to limit the transfer of weapons from the U.S. to Israel via the Shannon Airport. James C. Kenny, U.S. Ambassador to Ireland at the time, said Irish officials were warned that the U.S. would use other airports if the policy continued.

Murphy Report

The Vatican stated that another leak of a February 2010 cable was "an act of extreme seriousness". The leak revealed that the Vatican had not replied to questions from the Commission that compiled the 2009 Murphy Report on the Sexual abuse scandal in the Catholic archdiocese of Dublin because it felt that such questions should be forwarded only through diplomatic channels. The Murphy Commission had written to Pope Benedict XVI as head of the Roman Catholic Church, and not as a Head of State, and the lack of any reply indicated to it that the Church was continuing to hide relevant facts behind the sovereignty of the Vatican City. Commenting to the press after its release, the Vatican said, "Naturally these reports reflect the perceptions and opinions of the people who wrote them, and cannot be considered as expressions of the Holy See itself, nor as exact quotations of the words of its officials".

Gerry Adams

A cable sent from Dublin suggested that the Irish Government had "rock solid evidence" that Gerry Adams was a member of the IRA military command structure, and Bertie Ahern believes Adams had advance knowledge of the 2004 Northern Bank robbery; claims that Mr Adams has continually denied.

== Italy ==
Italy-Russia relations

American officials voiced concerns over Silvio Berlusconi's relationship with Vladimir Putin, "including 'lavish gifts,' lucrative energy contracts and a 'shadowy' Russian-speaking Italian go-between". Diplomats consider him "to be the mouthpiece of Putin" in Europe.

Italy–Kosovo relations

Berlusconi is alleged to have not supported Kosovo's independence because of his affinity towards Russia.

Natural gas pipelines

The Georgian ambassador in Rome has told American officials that Georgia believes Putin has promised Berlusconi a percentage of profits from any pipelines developed by Gazprom in coordination with Eni S.p.A.

Foreign policy

Berlusconi's foreign policy is seen as chaotic, meddling with critical themes and "complicating international efforts" in matters such as Iranian nuclear crisis, relationship with Russia and G8 policies.

Narcotics

The Italian mafia, particularly the Camorra, sell drugs manufactured in Afghanistan. Some of these drugs are sold in America. Some of the profits from these drug sales support terrorists groups in Afghanistan.

== Netherlands ==
American nuclear weapons

Although considered an open secret, it has been established by WikiLeaks that the U.S. has nuclear weapons based in the Royal Netherlands Air Force's Volkel Air Base, Netherlands.

Communications infrastructure

The Port of Rotterdam and the coastal towns of Beverwijk and Katwijk are seen as part of many critical points in a logistic chain. In Beverwijk, the Atlantic Crossing cable number 1 (AC-1), a cable that transports speech and data traffic between the U.S., the U.K., the Netherlands and Germany, meets shore, while in Katwijk the TransAtlantic Telephone cable number 14 (TAT-14), meets shore. The latter is mostly vital for data and internet traffic.

Narcotics

Criminals transport drugs, in particular cocaine, into Europe through the Netherlands. They also produce extensive quantities of amphetamines and MDMA ("ecstasy") in the Netherlands. That output is both consumed within the Netherlands and exported to other countries. One of the export targets is America. Excluding domestic production, America imports nearly all of its ecstasy from the Netherlands.

== Norway ==
Surveillance Detection Unit

The Surveillance Detection Unit row, caused by US embassy personnel conducting secret surveillance on host country citizens and inhabitants.

Lockheed Martin F-35 Lightning II

F-35 contract: lobbying for the Lockheed Martin plane and with an eye on further contracts, the US Ambassadors to Sweden and Norway recommended export license blocks and high-level advocacy, warning that an adverse decision would 'weaken one of the strongest pillars of our bilateral relationship' and damage Norway's long-term interests. In the aftermath of the decision, the Norwegian Deputy Defense Minister said it would be 'very helpful' if the US government were to confirm there had been no political pressure to buy the plane.

== Poland ==
MIM-104 Patriot

The diplomatic cables reveal the U.S. army Patriot missiles, deployed in north-eastern Poland in early 2010, were neither operational nor armed with missiles and their value was purely symbolic. The Polish government however publicly stated that the U.S. Patriot battery had boosted Polish air defences. The February 2009 cable from Victor Ashe, the U.S. ambassador in Warsaw, to Washington reveals that the Poles had not yet been told that the battery would rotate without actual missiles (they were informed of this in November 2009), and that the Polish officials expectations were naive.

== Portugal ==
- According to a 28 July 2008 diplomatic cable from the U.S. Embassy in Lisbon, nuclear and/or radiological materials allegedly stolen from the Chernobyl Nuclear Power Plant were thought to be in possession of an unidentified ex-Russian general living in Portugal. The cable reports, "The walk-in stated he was approached two months ago by a part-time business associate named Orlando to help sell 'Uranium plates' owned by an unidentified ex-Russian General living in Portugal."

== Romania ==
- Former European Commissioner for External Relations Chris Patten was quoted saying in 2004 that Croatia was probably far more prepared for E.U. membership than either Bulgaria or Romania, adding that Romania, in particular, was a "feral nation".
- The U.S. Embassy in Paris informs about a talk between Pierre Moscovici and Victoria Nuland, U.S. Ambassador to NATO. The 2006 cable reads that Moscovici said that Romania and Bulgaria will join the EU in 2007 but the joining will be accompanied by heated debates.
- A 2007 cable presents a discussion among American and French diplomats. One of the French diplomats comment that Russians could argue that American military bases in Bulgaria and Romania are destined not only for trainings but also for new implementations. The comment is not explained nor commented.
- A 2009 cable presents information for FBI director Robert Mueller reading that France is a destination of "prostitute victims" and Romania appears as a supplier of prostitutes
- On 5 February 2009 Hillary Clinton meets French Foreign Affairs Bernard Kouchner and talks include a mention that Romania and Poland were completely cut off from the energy policy.

== Russia ==
- A diplomatic cable reports on alleged links between the Russian government and organised crime. Russia was labeled as a Mafia state.
- Dmitry Medvedev, President of Russia, often acts under the influence of Vladimir Putin, Prime Minister of Russia, and "plays Robin to Putin's Batman".
- Diplomats were highly skeptical of Putin's claim that he knew nothing about Alexander Litvinenko's poisoning.
- U.S. dispatches had apparently reported as early as 2007 that Russia had provided Grad missiles and other arms to the Georgian separatist regions of South Ossetia and Abkhazia, and had engaged in a large variety of covert activities aimed at destabilizing Georgia before the 2008 South Ossetia war.
- Russian leaders, in response to the Holodomor, a massive famine in Ukraine that killed millions that some attribute to allegedly deliberate policies by the Soviet government at the time, sent a letter by Medvedev to Azerbaijan President Ilham Aliyev telling him that if Azerbaijan supported the designation of the Bolshevik artificial famine in Ukraine as "genocide" at the U.N., "then you can forget about seeing [the break-away republic of] Nagorno-Karabakh ever again."
- Russian prison system: in a 2008 cable, the US ambassador summarized the status quo: 'The Russian prison system combines the country's emblematic features—vast distances, harsh climate, and an uncaring bureaucracy—and fuses them into a massive instrument of punishment.'
- Yukos/Khodorkovsky trial: suggesting that the legal process was only 'gloss', the US has described his trial as 'lipstick on a political pig'.
- Serbian government officials have privately told American diplomats in Belgrade that Russia may be withholding vital information about the whereabouts of the fugitive Bosnian Serb general and genocide suspect, Ratko Mladić.
- At the 4 April 2008, NATO-Russia Council Summit in Bucharest, Romania, Putin "implicitly challenged" the territorial integrity of Ukraine.
- In a January 2009 US diplomatic cable (then) Ambassador of Ukraine to Russia Kostyantyn Gryshchenko stated that Kremlin leaders wanted to see a totally subservient to Moscow regency in Ukraine and that Putin "hated" then-Ukrainian President Viktor Yushchenko and had a low personal regard for (eventually Yushchenko's successor) Viktor Yanukovych but saw then-Ukrainian Prime Minister Yulia Tymoshenko as someone perhaps not that he can trust, but with whom he can deal.

Chechnya

- Reports that Ramzan Kadyrov, the Chechnyan leader, "showered" his friends at a wedding with gold.
- Reports from an unnamed, non-Chechen source in Moscow that the Kremlin-appointed Chechen leadership was "lacking experts to develop programs for economic recovery, is simply demanding and disposing of cash from the central government."
- Chris Patten, the former European Commissioner for External Relations, apparently said of Putin, "He seems a completely reasonable man when discussing the Middle East or energy policy, but when the conversation shifts to Chechnya or Islamic extremism, Putin's eyes turn to those of a killer."

Dagestan

- Reports on the lavish lifestyle of the Dagestani elites.
- Concerns about increasing levels of Islamic fundamentalism.

== Serbia and Kosovo ==
- In 2009, French diplomat Jean-David Levitte said that EULEX Kosovo has diplomatic issues with the Kosovo government and public, and that Serbian Foreign Minister Vuk Jeremić, "makes promises that he never keeps". He also criticised Jeremić for inaction in encouraging "Serb return or participation in the Kosovo government".
- The U.S. had sent a team of U.S. Federal Bureau of Investigation experts in fugitive recovery to Belgrade to help the manhunt for Mladić and assess the Serbian operations.
- The Guardian suggested that cables regarding Serbia awaiting publication could refer to reasons why Ratko Mladić — the former Chief of Staff of the Army of Republika Srpska (Bosnian Serb Army) during the Bosnian War (1992–1995) who was then a fugitive and allegedly committed war crimes against Bosniaks and Croats — had not yet been arrested.

== Slovenia ==
- According to the cables, the U.S. State Department ordered diplomats to spy on their Slovenian counterparts, with directives such as gaining their credit-card numbers and phone books. American diplomats were also ordered to research Slovenian international relations, including various agreements and projects connected to Russia. The U.S. also wanted to gain information on subjects such as money laundering and organised crime, as well as information on locations of various chemical factories, secret underground military bases, evacuation plans of hospitals and buildings of the government and Slovenia's commitment to the War in Afghanistan.
- According to another cable documents written in October 2009 and signed by Hillary Clinton, the U.S. was pressuring Slovene officials to hurry with the negotiations and allow Croatia to enter NATO, and threatened that in opposite scenario United States are going to "pour wrath upon Slovenia".

== Spain ==
- U.S. officials tried to pressure Spain into dropping court investigations into the CIA's extraordinary rendition, torture at Guantanamo Bay, and the 2003 killing of José Couso, a Spanish journalist, in Iraq by American troops. Moreover, politicians such as the former Deputy Prime Minister María Teresa Fernández de la Vega and the former Minister of Foreign Affairs Miguel Ángel Moratinos, the Attorney General Cándido Conde-Pumpido and Audiencia Nacional judge Javier Gómez Bermúdez, among others, also collaborated with U.S. officials in the above cases and in forcing the downfall of Audiencia Nacional judge Baltasar Garzón.
- Former KGB and FSB agent and Putin critic Alexander Litvinenko, who was poisoned in London in 2006, tipped off Spanish authorities on several organised crime bosses with links to Spain.

== Sweden ==
- According to Swedish television SVT, a yet-to-be-released cable from the U.S. Embassy in Stockholm reveals that Swedish authorities have secretly cooperated with the U.S. government handing over information about Swedish citizens, who might be associated with terrorism. According to the report the Swedish authorities knew about American surveillance of Swedish citizens but were hiding it from the public. Michael M. Wood, U.S. Ambassador to Sweden, writes in the leaked cable that this cooperation would not pass a parliamentary hearing, and that it could be unconstitutional. Nevertheless, he recommended to stick with the secret practice. Swedish Minister for Justice Beatrice Ask claimed she had no knowledge of this type of cooperation.
- The U.S. government was very concerned about file-sharing-related issues in Sweden. The U.S. Embassy actively worked with the Swedish authorities to reduce file-sharing-related threats, including The Pirate Bay, a Swedish website, which was raided in 2006 following U.S. pressure. The diplomatic cables reveal how the U.S. pressured Sweden, despite the Swedish prosecutors' claim that there had been no political interference.
- The Surveillance Detection Unit row, caused by US embassy personnel conducting secret surveillance on host country citizens and inhabitants. Shortly after the initial report in Norway, the Swedish government confirmed that similar secret surveillance of residents of Stockholm had been sponsored by the U.S. Embassy there, and Justice Minister Beatrice Ask said that the authorities had yet to be adequately informed. She described the situation as "very serious". The Finnish newspaper Helsingin Sanomat referred to 2000 Swedes under surveillance by the US Embassy's SDU in Stockholm.
- Saab Gripen fighter contracts: lobbying successfully for the Lockheed Martin F-35 against the Gripen for the Norwegian Air Force, and with an eye also on further contracts with the Danish Air Force, the US Ambassador rehearsed the Swedish case for the release and installation of a US radar system in its planes (involvement in Afghanistan, Kosovo, Iraq; enhanced cooperation with NATO) before recommending an export license block be placed on the new system prior to the Norwegian decision.

== Switzerland ==
- According to cables from July 2009, then-economic minister Doris Leuthard accepted prisoners from the Guantanamo Bay detention camp in exchange of the limitation of a multi-billion tax avoidance probe against Swiss banking group UBS, including one Uzbek and two Uighurs. The negotiations took place in foreign ministers meeting February 2009 and it was also agreed that the Swiss government would shut down Swedish engineering firm Colenco's commercial activities out of concern for nuclear proliferation in Iran.

== Turkey ==
Armenian genocide

A cable signed by David Arnett on July 4, 2004 at the Consulate General of the US in Istanbul states that Turkey's systematic destruction of incriminating documentation concerning the Armenian genocide occurred in two phases: first during the Istanbul trials of 1919–1920, and later when Turgut Özal worked to open the archives between the late 1980s and early 1990s. Nuri Birgi, who served as Turkey's ambassador to the UK and NATO, was in charge of the second purge. During the process, Birgi said in reference to the Armenians: "We really slaughtered them." According to Arnett, Turkey's denial policy is motivated by a desire to protect the "Turkish identity" developed by Mustafa Kemal Atatürk: "acknowledging any wrongs inflicted on the Armenians would call into question Turkey’s own claims of victimization and its borders, and would make Turkey vulnerable to claims for indemnity."

Exclusion of India in meetings

Turkey did not invite India for a meeting on Afghanistan to appease Pakistan, reflecting Islamabad's insistence at every international forum that India be kept out of any meeting on Afghanistan.

Roj TV

Anders Fogh Rasmussen, former Prime Minister of Denmark, during a meeting with Turkish foreign ministry undersecretary Feridun Sinirlioglu, promised to shut down the controversial Denmark-based Kurdish television station Roj TV, to prevent Turkish obstruction to his appointment as Secretary General of NATO.

Sarah, Duchess of York

Turkey complained to British diplomats that Sarah, Duchess of York wanted to ruin Turkey's chances to join the European Union by filming a documentary revealing the plight of disabled children in Turkey. The U.K. foreign secretary responded by saying that "as a private citizen, her activities could not 'be controlled'".

Pope Benedict XVI

Pope Benedict XVI wanted Muslim Turkey kept out of E.U. The Pope is responsible for the Vatican's growing hostility towards Turkey joining the E.U., previously secret cables sent from the U.S. embassy to the Holy See in Rome claim. The U.S. diplomat noted that the Pope "clearly understands that allowing a Muslim country into the E.U. would further weaken his case for Europe's Christian foundations".

Azerbaijan-Turkey relations

Ilham Aliyev, President of Azerbaijan, is no fan of Recep Tayyip Erdoğan, Prime Minister of Turkey, and the ruling Justice and Development Party despite both countries maintaining fraternal relations publicly. Aliyev criticised Turkish foreign policy by calling it "naïve". He also revealed that he had sold gas to Russia in order to impede Turkey's ability to "create a gas distribution hub".

Claim of weapons to Iraq cable

Prior to the initial WikiLeaks cable release, Arutz Sheva reported an al Hayat claim that WikiLeaks revealed that Turkish authorities "allowed money and weapons to pass across Turkey's border with Iraq, en route to Al Qaeda terrorists in Iraq." A cable, unpublished as of 4 January 2011, is claimed to state, "Large amounts of water have arrived from Turkey, large waves will hit Baghdad in a few hours. Some people are widening the irrigation canals." Arutz Sheva stated, 'This message is believed to refer to the arrival of weapons from Turkey, that were intended for terror and warfare in Baghdad. Al Hayat also says that the WikiLeaks documents show that ammunition seized in a terrorist's apartment in Iraq in 2009 bore the markings "made in Turkey".'

Predator drones

Turkish military officials have pressured the U.S. for Predator B drones, to use against the Kurdistan Workers Party in Iraq. Because of American concerns over a potential rise of Islamic fundamentalism in Turkey, the "State Department has warned that the purchasing process promises to be 'long and complex.'"

Incirlik Air Base

Turkey's Incirlik Air Base was used by the CIA to move Muslim detainees under Prime Minister Recep Tayyip Erdogan's watch.

== Ukraine ==
- At the 4 April 2008, NATO-Russia Council Summit in Bucharest, Romania, Vladimir Putin, President of Russia, "implicitly challenged" the territorial integrity of Ukraine.
- In an 8 December 2008 meeting with William B. Taylor, Jr., U.S. Ambassador to Ukraine, Ukrainian billionaire Dmytro Firtash told of needing permission from alleged Russian crime boss Semyon Mogilevich to do business in Ukraine during the lawless 1990s; Firtash has denied the remarks. Allegedly, Gazprom, a Russian natural-gas extraction company, had asked Mogilevich to oversee natural-gas deliveries from Russia to Ukraine via gas intermediary RosUkrEnergo. All parties deny connections with Mogilevich. Firtash also claimed to be friends with Viktor Yushchenko, President of Ukraine.
- Other cables said Firtash and Mogilevich were linked through ostensible offshore company vehicles either by joint ownership through former spouses or through Firtash heading companies in which Mogilevich's former spouse was the shareholder. It was also suspected that Raiffeisen Zentralbank, an Austrian-based bank, was a front to legitimize RosUkrEnergo.
- The U.S. is fighting a constant battle to stop the flow of arms from Ukraine and other Eastern European countries to terrorists in the Middle East and Southern Sudan.
- According to a former Party of Regions lawmaker, Yulia Tymoshenko—former Prime Minister of Ukraine—allocated seventy percent of government spending without tenders. Tymoshenko's Yulia Tymoshenko Bloc (BYuT) and Party of Regions have been long-time political rivals.
- In a January 2009 US diplomatic cable (then) Ambassador of Ukraine to Russia Kostyantyn Gryshchenko stated that Kremlin leaders wanted to see a totally subservient to Moscow regency in Ukraine and that Putin "hated" then-President Yushchenko and had a low personal regard for Viktor Yanukovych but saw then-Prime Minister Tymoshenko as someone perhaps not that he can trust, but with whom he can deal.

== United Kingdom ==
Diego Garcia and Chagos Islanders

U.K. Foreign Office officials misled the public over Diego Garcia, and privately admitted no regret over the eviction of the Chagos islanders (Chagossians).

Cluster bombs

U.K. Foreign Office officials concealed from Parliament a loophole in the ban on use and storage of cluster bombs, allowing the U.S. to store the munitions on U.K. territory

Rapid Action Battalion

The United Kingdom has assisted in training the Rapid Action Battalion (RAB) an elite anti-crime and anti-terrorism unit of Bangladesh Police which is described by the Human Rights Watch as a "government death squad". It was held responsible for more than 1000 extrajudicial killings. The British training was involved in "investigative interviewing techniques" and "rules of engagement" and conducted by serving British police officers, working under the auspices of the National Policing Improvement Agency (NPIA). However, the U.S. has been aware of this training sessions but its government was constrained by RAB's "alleged human rights violations, which have rendered the organisation ineligible to receive training or assistance [by U.S.]".

Iraq Inquiry

The U.K. Ministry of Defence's director general for security policy told Ellen Tauscher, U.S. Under Secretary of State for Arms Control and International Security Affairs, that the U.K. government had "put measures in place to protect your interests during the UK inquiry into the causes of the Iraq war".

Sri Lankan Civil War

U.K. Secretary of State David Miliband directed much of his attention to the final stages of Sri Lankan Civil War in order to win the votes of Tamils in the UK.

RAF Akrotiri

The U.S. dismissed U.K. concerns about the use of RAF Akrotiri to stage U-2 spy plane flights.

Lockerbie bombing

The British government secretly supported the early release of Abdelbaset al-Megrahi, who was convicted of carrying out the Lockerbie bombing. At the time, the British Government did not publicly support or oppose the decision. Following the 2010 U.K. general election but prior to the cables leak, the new British government stated that the release, authorised by the Scottish government, was "a mistake" which it regretted.

Finsbury Park Mosque

A group of U.S. officials took a tour of the Finsbury Park Mosque on November 6, 2007. The membership of that mosque became radicalized sometime around the year 2000. According to one official at the mosque, Abu Hamza al-Masri was able to turn the mosque into a safe haven for extremists. In an attempt to rectify the situation, the mosque gave him an eviction notice, but al-Masri refused to leave. The mosque also informed the police of the situation, but much to their chagrin, the police did nothing about it until 2003 when they arrested al-Masri.

== Vatican City/Holy See ==
U.K.–Vatican relations

Relations between the U.K. and the Vatican "were facing their worst crisis in 150 years" because of Pope Benedict XVI's invitation to convert followers of the Church of England who opposed female priests.

Accession of Turkey to the European Union

According to Pietro Parolin, the Pope's voice is behind the Vatican's growing hostility towards Turkey joining the European Union because he believed that allowing a Muslim country into the EU would further weaken his case for Europe's Christian foundations. When he was still a Cardinal in 2004, the Pope had spoken out against a Muslim state joining the EU when the Vatican had then held a neutral opinion on the question, and was the leading voice behind the Holy See's unsuccessful drive to secure a reference to Europe's "Christian roots" in the EU constitution. But by 2006 when Parolin was working for Ratzinger, now Pope Benedict XVI, he stated: "Neither the pope nor the Vatican have endorsed Turkey's EU membership per se... rather, the Holy See has been consistently open to accession, emphasizing only that Turkey needs to fulfil the EU's Copenhagen criteria to take its place in Europe."

Task Force for International Cooperation on Holocaust Education, Remembrance, and Research

The Vatican withdrew from a written agreement to join Task Force for International Cooperation on Holocaust Education, Remembrance, and Research (ITF) because of tensions over the activity of Pope Pius XII, the pope during the World War II, who has been a controversial figure for his failure publicly to denounce the Holocaust.

2007 Iranian seizure of Royal Navy personnel

U.S. diplomats believed the Pope was instrumental in securing the release of 15 British sailors captured and held by Iran in 2007.

Murphy report

Vatican officials were offended when their fellow priests were summoned from Rome to testify before an Irish commission investigating the 2009 Murphy report. The cable revealed that U.S. diplomats believed that Vatican officials felt that Irish opposition politicians wanted to make political gains from the investigation. Ultimately the Vatican officials were granted immunity by the Irish government.

Communication technology

Vatican communication technology within the Pope's inner circle is not up to modern standards, as evident by several communication mishaps during Benedict's papacy. Few Vatican officials have e-mail accounts, and only one has a BlackBerry. "Most of the top ranks of the Vatican, all men, generally in their seventies, do not understand modern media and new information technologies" reported Julieta Valls Noyes, the Deputy Chief of Mission of the U.S. Embassy to the Holy See.

Pope Benedict XVI

After the election of Pope Benedict XVI, US diplomats recommended that the US Department of State seek to 'help shape his approach as he begins to grapple with the world beyond the Vatican's walls'.
