= Henry D. Owen =

American diplomat

7th Director of Policy Planning
- In office June 19, 1966 – February 8, 1969
- President: Lyndon B. Johnson
- Preceded by: Walt Whitman Rostow
- Succeeded by: William Cargo

Personal details
- Born: August 26, 1920
- Died: November 5, 2011 (aged 91)

Henry David Owen (August 26, 1920 – November 5, 2011) was a diplomat, Brookings Institution Director (1969–78) and United States Ambassador at Large for Economic Summit Affairs from 1977 to 1981, on the National Security Council.

== Life ==
Owen was born in Forest Hills, Queens. He graduated from Birch Wathen Lenox School, and Harvard University with a BA in 1941.

He served in the United States Navy from 1942 to 1946 and on the U.S. State Department's Policy Planning Staff from 1952 to 1968. He recruited Zbigniew Brzezinski. He was director of foreign policy study, at the Brookings Institution, from 1968 to 1977.

He was a member of the American Academy of Diplomacy, Council on Foreign Relations, and Trilateral Commission.
