= Ivan Williams Field =

Football and track stadium in Michigan

Coordinates: 42.78844°N 83.73383°W

Ivan Williams Field is a football and track stadium located in Fenton, Michigan. The original 1,700-seat stadium was built in 1969 as Tiger Field, along with the rest of the Fenton High School campus and served as home to the high school's Tigers football and track teams for 37 years.

The stadium was demolished in 2007 and a new 2,500-seat stadium was built on the same site later that year. As did its predecessor it is the home to Fenton High School Tigers football and track.

Although part of the Fenton Area School District complex, Ivan Williams Field, and adjoining athletics facilities are managed by Southern Lakes Parks and Recreation, allowing the stadium to be used for community events, including the Fenton Freedom Festival fireworks and other special events.

Additional athletic facilities at Fenton High School include athletic fields, a 2,300-seat multipurpose gymnasium, and a recently renovated natatorium.
