= Lisa Davis (advocate) =

American legal scholar, educator, and advocate

- Born: August 24, 1974 (age 52); Poughkeepsie, New York, U.S.
- Occupations: Legal scholar, educator, advocate
- Years active: 2010–present
- Spouse: Jessica Stern

Academic background
- Education: St. Mary's College of Maryland (BA); American University (MA); CUNY School of Law (JD)

Academic work
- Discipline: International criminal law, Human rights law
- Notable works: ICC Policy on the Crime of Gender Persecution (2022)
- Website: www.law.cuny.edu/faculty/lisa-davis/

Lisa Lynn Davis (born August 24, 1974) is an American legal scholar, educator, and international human rights advocate. They currently serve as the Senior Associate Dean of Clinical Programs and a Professor of Law at the City University of New York (CUNY) School of Law. Davis is also a Special Adviser on Gender and Other Discriminatory Crimes to the Prosecutor of the International Criminal Court (ICC). Their expertise centers on international criminal law, gender justice, and the protection of marginalized groups, including women and LGBTQI+ persons, in conflict settings.

== Early life and education ==
Davis was born in Poughkeepsie, New York. They began their higher education at Russell Sage College, where they received the Chavez-King Award and the Excellence in Sociology Award. They earned a Bachelor of Arts in Anthropology and Sociology from St. Mary's College of Maryland in 1999.

In 2005, they completed a Master of Arts in International Politics at the American University School of International Service, where they served as a research assistant to Professor Julie Mertus. Davis graduated with a Juris Doctor from CUNY School of Law in 2008, where they served as Editor-in-Chief of the CUNY Law Review, Vice President of the International Law Society, and a member of OutLaws.

== Professional career ==
=== Academic positions ===
Davis began teaching at CUNY School of Law in 2010. They joined the faculty in 2018 as an Associate Professor of Law and were promoted to tenured Full Professor in 2023. In 2024, they were appointed Senior Associate Dean of Clinical Programs. They co-direct the Human Rights and Gender Justice (HRGJ) Clinic.

In 2023, Davis co-founded the Institute for Gender, Law and Transformative Peace alongside Nobel Laureate Leymah Gbowee. Davis has held visiting professorships at Leiden University as a Fulbright Scholar (2022) and at Columbia University (2016–2017).

Davis's work on the protection of marginalized groups in conflict settings has been recognized by international organizations such as Human Rights Watch for its impact on global activism for lesbian, bisexual, and queer women.

=== International and government appointments ===
In December 2024, Davis was appointed Special Adviser on Gender and Other Discriminatory Crimes to the Prosecutor of the International Criminal Court, after previously serving as the ICC's Special Adviser on Gender Persecution from 2022 to 2023. In this capacity, Davis helped shape the landmark gender persecution charges in the Afghanistan arrest warrants. These represented the first ICC arrest warrant decisions to explicitly include persons targeted for gender identity or expression, specifically recognizing LGBTQI+ victims.

In 2024, they served as a Senior Advisor to the Ambassador-at-Large for Global Criminal Justice|U.S. Ambassador-at-Large for Global Criminal Justice on a secondment, contributing to the first U.S. policy position recognizing abuses in Afghanistan as gender persecution.

=== Litigation and U.N. decisions ===
Davis has served as plaintiff, counsel, or expert in several international legal matters:

- Davis was a plaintiff in Gabor Rona & Lisa Davis v. Donald Trump (2025): Successfully challenged Executive Order 14,203 regarding sanctions on individuals linked to the ICC. The lawsuit contested the Trump administration's sanctions targeting individuals associated with the International Criminal Court. In July 2025, the U.S. District Court for the Southern District of New York ruled the executive order violated Davis's and Rona's free speech rights under the First Amendment and issued a permanent injunction.
- Special Jurisdiction for Peace (JEP), Colombia: Their scholarship was cited in a 2023 trial judgment finding crimes against humanity of persecution based on gender, race, and ethnicity.
- Supreme Court of India (2018): Their joint submission was cited in the judgment striking down Penal Code Section 377, which had criminalized consensual homosexual acts.
- U.N. Committee Against Torture (2015): Led a legal submission on behalf of Iraqi clients resulting in a decision holding state agents responsible for third-party gender-based violence.
- Karen Atala and Daughters v. Chile (2012): Co-authored the sole amicus curiae brief leading to a decision prohibiting discrimination based on sexual orientation.
- Inter-American Commission on Human Rights (2010): Served as lead counsel for displaced Haitian women, resulting in the first precautionary measures recognizing state responsibility to prevent sexual violence.

== Selected publications ==
=== Policies ===
- Policy on the Crime of Gender Persecution, International Criminal Court, Office of the Prosecutor (2022).

=== Law review articles ===
- "Post-Conflict Reparations: Methods for Addressing Discrimination," U. Pa. J. Int'l L. (2025).
- "Dusting Off the Law Books: Recognizing Gender Persecution in Conflicts and Atrocities," NW. J. Hum. Rts (2021).
- "Still Trembling: State Obligation Under International Law To End Post-earthquake Rape In Haiti," U. Miami L. Rev. (2011).

=== Editorials ===
- "Dusting off the Law Books on the Crime of Gender Persecution," Just Security (2023)
- "The ICC's Arrest Warrants Against Taliban Leaders Are Historic," Foreign Policy (2025).

== Awards and recognition ==
- New York State Court Recognition (2025): Honored by the New York State Appellate Division, Second Department, for significant contributions to LGBTQI+ rights and legal advocacy.
- LGBTQ+ Power Players in NY (2022): Named by Gay City News.
- The People's Choice Gavel Award (2011): Awarded by Women's Link Worldwide for their role as lead counsel in Haiti litigation.

== Personal life ==
Davis is married to Jessica Stern. They maintain a professional residence in the New York City metropolitan area.
