= Jeanie Jew =

Chinese American advocate

Jeanie Jew is a fourth-generation Chinese American advocate who played an important role in the creation of Asian American and Pacific Islander Heritage Month. She was born to a family that worked on the Transcontinental Railroad. Jew helped found the Organization of Chinese American Women.

== Family life and education ==
Jew's grandfather M.Y. Lee moved to America in the 1800s, during a time when anti-Asian American sentiment was at its peak. He was among the 20,000 Chinese migrant workers who helped build the Transcontinental Railroad. Lee traveled to Oregon to try and resolve issues Chinese Americans were facing there, but was killed due to racism.

== Career ==
Jew worked as a staffer on Capitol Hill. After witnessing the 1976 U.S Bicentennial celebrations, Jew became frustrated that there was nothing to honor Asian and Pacific Americans. According to the U.S census from 1970 to 1980 the population of Asian Americans doubled during the decade from 1.5 million people to 3.7 million people. The significant amount of contributions Asian Americans provided was something that Jew thought needed recognition. Jew approached Representative Frank Horton of New York with the idea that there should be a month dedicated to Asian Americans. U.S representative Horton and another representative from California Norman Mineta co-sponsored a bill that urged for Asian Americans to have a week dedicated to them. A month later, two Hawaiian representatives introduced a bill that would recognize Pacific Islanders as well. They later combined the bills and renamed it to include the "Asian American and Pacific Islander" community.

Jew was able to generate support for this bill by connecting with advocacy organizations and through the general public. Jew received support from 231 congressional members who co-sponsored the bill. The bill was labeled the House Joint Resolution 1007 and was passed with majority votes in both the House and the Senate. President Jimmy Carter signed the resolution October 5, 1978. The week beginning on May 4 of 1979 was the established week for Asian/Pacific American Heritage week. The biggest flaw with this legislation was that lacking language that declared the week an annual celebration. In 1990, president George H.W Bush signed a declaration changing the entire month of May to an annual celebration that is now known as Asian/Pacific American Heritage month. The month of May was also selected on Jew's behalf in order to honor her grandfather and the other brave Asian Americans who completed the building of the Transcontinental Railroad on May 10, 1869. The second significance May has is to commemorate the first Japanese immigrants to the US on May 7, 1843.

In 1977, Jeanie Jew in conjunction with Pauline Tsui and Julia Chang Bloch founded the Organization of Chinese American Women (OCAW). The Organization lobbied the federal government on issues such as immigration laws. OCAW also coordinated with the Immigration and Naturalization Services to help Asian immigrants apply for permanent residency and supported get out the vote campaigns to improve Asian American voter turnout. From 1997 to 2001, Jew served as OCAW National President.

In the 2020s, Asian American activists point to Jeanie Jew as a source of inspiration.
