= Ralph Frank =

American diplomat

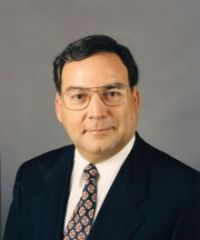

United States Ambassador to Nepal
- In office August 1, 1997 – August 10, 2001
- President: Bill Clinton
- Preceded by: Sandra Louise Vogelgesang
- Succeeded by: Michael Malinowski

United States Ambassador to Croatia
- In office April 16, 2003 – January 7, 2006
- President: George W. Bush
- Preceded by: Lawrence G. Rossin
- Succeeded by: Robert Bradtke

Personal details
- Born: 1946 (age 79–80) Casper, Wyoming
- Education: University of Washington Foster School of Business
- Profession: Diplomat

Ralph Frank (born 1946) is the former American ambassador to Nepal (1997–2001) and Croatia (2003–2006).

Frank received a BA in 1968 and an MBA in 1973 from the University of Washington.

A cable written by Frank in November 2003 revealed the American interest in obtaining the S-300 surface-to-air missile system from Croatia. The Croatian government acquired the system in 1995, before the Operation Storm, but it was incomplete and was never operative. According to other sources, including the court testimony of arms dealer Zvonko Zubak, the system was indeed shipped to the U.S. in 2004. (See Contents of the United States diplomatic cables leak (Europe))

Diplomatic posts
Preceded by Lawrence G. Rossin	United States Ambassador to Croatia; 2003–2006	Succeeded by Robert Bradtke
