= US–China Education Trust =

Non-profit organization based in Washington, D.C.

- Parent institution: F.Y. Chang Foundation
- Established: 1998; 28 years ago
- President: Julia Chang Bloch
- Chair: Nicholas Platt
- Address: 1957 E Street NW, Suite 605 Washington, D.C. 20052
- Location: Washington, D.C.
- Website: uscet.org

The US–China Education Trust (USCET, Chinese: 中美教育基金; pinyin: Zhōng-Měi Jiàoyù Jījīn) is a non-profit organization based in Washington D.C. Founded in 1998 by Ambassador Julia Chang Bloch, the first Chinese American U.S. Ambassador, USCET seeks to promote China–United States relations through a series of education and exchange programs. The organization sponsors a variety of fellowships, conferences, workshops and exchanges, focused primarily on strengthening Chinese academic institutions related to the fields of American Studies, Media and Journalism, American Governance, and International Relations.

== Programs ==
USCET's activities currently fall within eight main program areas:

=== The American Studies Network ===
Conceived to strengthen American Studies programs in China, this consortium of academic institutions, now numbering more than 50, provides opportunities for members to collaborate, share resources, and develop their capacity to teach about American society and culture. One of the primary goals of the ASN is to promote a more comprehensive understanding of the United States in China by sponsoring academic research in fields that go beyond politics and US–China relations, which tend to dominate Chinese research about America. As such, the ASN encourages scholarly collaboration and research on topics such as American culture and religion. ASN activities include an annual conference for all member universities; an American Studies Fellows program which places young Chinese scholars at American universities for a mentored semester-long fellowship; and delegations of American Studies scholars from China to the annual meeting of the American Studies Association in the United States.

=== Media Education Consortium ===
Similar to the ASN, the Media Education Consortium (MEC) is a network of schools of journalism and communication at over 30 Chinese universities. Through annual conferences and short-term workshops, USCET seeks to use the MEC to expand the capacity of Chinese universities to train professionally skilled journalists and broadcasters. MEC programs work to build practical investigative and reporting skills for Chinese journalism students, and to strengthen the role of professionalism and media ethics within Chinese media and communication curricula.

=== American Governance ===
USCET's earliest initiative in China, the Congressional Practicum, has expanded to include elections seminars, training sessions, and annual lectures that build knowledge among Chinese professionals, officials, and students about the workings of the US legislative and political process. Past programs have included case studies, hands-on training, and interactive exchanges among US and Chinese experts.

=== USCET Student Leaders Exchange ===
This program was the first in the United States to be launched under President Barack Obama's "100,000 Strong" Initiative to increase the number of American students studying in China. The program provides grants to American universities to encourage students to study abroad in China. Universities will use the funds to award travel grants to students enrolled in summer, semester, and academic year study abroad programs. Current partner universities include Boston University, San Francisco State University, the University of Arkansas, and the University of North Alabama.

=== Summer Institutes ===
Summer Institutes are short term academic sessions for Asian students and scholars in the United States. The 2010 Summer Institute, entitled "U.S. Foreign Policy for East Asian Student Leaders," brought 20 undergraduate students from China, Korea, and Japan to Washington, DC for a four-week academic program about American politics and society. The 2010 Institute combined classroom discussions, guest lectures, field trips, and a study tour.

=== Greenberg/Starr Scholarships ===
Named in honor of American businessman and philanthropist Maurice Greenberg, this program supports the studies of 10 Chinese students from low-income families each year, covering the cost of their full tuition at Yunnan University.

=== USCET-TFAS Fellowships ===
USCET sponsors the participation of several Chinese university students at summer institutes organized each year by The Fund for American Studies (TFAS) at Georgetown University. Summer institutes cover a variety of topics including political journalism, philanthropy and voluntary service, business and government affairs, and comparative political and economic systems.

=== Law programs ===
USCET is the programs arm of the FY Chang Foundation, a fund endowed by Ambassador Julia Chang Bloch and her husband Stuart Marshall Bloch at Harvard Law School in 1988. The foundation was established in memory of Bloch's father, Chang Fuyun, the first Chinese national to graduate from Harvard Law School, and offers scholarships to Chinese students to study at Harvard Law. In addition, the fund sponsors an annual FY Chang Lecture, which brings together eminent legal scholars and jurists from China, the US, Hong Kong and Taiwan to speak at the Peking University Law School. The 2010 FY Chang Lecture was given by former US Trade Representative Charlene Barshefsky.

== History ==
Ambassador Bloch first laid initial groundwork for the US–China Education Trust while serving as a visiting professor at the Institute for International Relations at Peking University during the 1998–1999 academic year. That year she lectured on American politics and US–China relations at the university and organized an international conference on the Asian financial crisis. She established a survey course at the university in American Civilization, a class which remains very popular on the campus today.

In 2001, USCET launched its first official project, a Congressional Studies program held at Fudan University's Center for American Studies. The organization formed a longstanding partnership with The Fund for American Studies (TFAS) in 2001, launching its first American Studies Summer Institute for Chinese undergraduate and graduate students at Georgetown University.

In 2004, the organization pioneered the foundation of the American Studies Network (ASN), a network of Chinese universities with American studies programs which currently includes more than 50 members. USCET's inaugural Financial Media Institute opened at Fudan University's School of Journalism in 2006. Directed by Terry Smith of PBS and Al Kamen of The Washington Post, the program brought together 22 journalism students from across China to complete an intensive certificate program. 2006 also saw USCET cooperating with the U.S. Department of Labor in delivering its first legislative training program with the People's Congresses of Shanghai and Chongqing on Mine Safety. The program, designed to help China develop and implement laws to prevent mine accidents and deaths, addressed a high priority area of Chinese policymaking. Subsequent FMI's have been held alternately at Fudan University and Hong Kong Baptist University.

The success of the Financial Media Institute led USCET to expand its activities within media education. In 2008 the organization successfully co-sponsored a Symposium on Global Journalism Education Reform with UNESCO at Tsinghua University. This predated the formal launch of the Media Education Consortium in 2009. In its two years of operation the MEC has become a vehicle to expose Chinese media educators to Western journalism philosophy and practices and improve the quality of training to China's next-generation broadcasters and journalists. MEC activities now include an annual conference, short-term academic workshops for Chinese graduate students, and a Journalist-In-Residence Program.

In 2010, USCET became the first organization to launch a program under President Barack Obama's 100,000 Strong Initiative to increase American academic exchange with China. The program, called the USCET Student Leader Exchange Program, will offer competitive travel grants to sponsor universities who demonstrate considerable effort to expand the number of undergraduates they send to study abroad in China. USCET first unveiled the program in a joint announcement at USCET's 7th American Studies Network (ASN) conference with Carola McGiffert, US State Department Senior Advisor to the Assistant Secretary of State for East Asia and the Pacific.

== Additional activities ==
Resources: USCET's website includes a comprehensive database of online resources related to American Studies, US–China relations, and academic exchange institutions between the US and China. A 2010 article by Terry Lautz in The Chronicle of Higher Education applauded this database as a good model for expanding American academic presence in China.

Awards programs: In 2010 USCET held the first annual Congressional Visionary Award, presented to honor "courage, foresight, and pioneering leadership in advancing US–China relations." The first annual awards luncheon honored Senator Dianne Feinstein who, as the mayor of San Francisco, launched the first ever "sister cities" relationship between an American city and a Chinese city, with the city of Shanghai. At the organization's 20th anniversary gala in 2009, it honored former Treasury Secretary Hank Paulson with an Executive Leadership Award.

== Funding ==
USCET's funding base includes a variety of private foundations, government agencies, and corporate sponsors. Past donors include:

- The United States Department of State
- The Henry Luce Foundation
- The Starr Foundation
- The Ford Foundation
- Van Eck Global
- Mohave Development
- Nationwide Insurance
- American Resort Development Association
- Continental Airlines
- Fidelity Investments
- Prudential
- Raytheon International
- Shelby Cullom Davis Foundation
- ULLICO Inc.
- UnitedHealth Group

== Founder ==
USCET was founded in 1998 by Julia Chang Bloch, the first Asian American to ever achieve the rank of ambassador. Bloch served as ambassador to Nepal from 1989 to 1993. Bloch's father, Chang Fuyun, was the first Chinese graduate of Harvard Law School. Bloch was born in Shandong, China and immigrated to San Francisco at age 9 with her parents in 1951. She holds a bachelor's degree in Communications and Public Policy from the University of California, Berkeley and a master's degree in Government and East Asia Regional Studies from Harvard University. Prior to founding USCET, Bloch spent 25 years in government service, holding various positions at the United States Agency for International Development, the US Information Agency, and the US Senate. She also spent five years in the private sector, serving various positions for Bank of America. She is married to retired lawyer and real estate specialist Stuart Marshall Bloch.

== Advisory council members ==
- Nicholas Platt, chair, ambassador emeritus to Pakistan, the Philippines, and Zambia, and president emeritus of the Asia Society
- Marlene Johnson, executive director and chief executive officer of NAFSA: Association of International Educators
- Robert A. Kapp, president of Robert A. Kapp & Associates, Inc., former president of US–China Business Council
- David M. Lampton, director of China Studies and Dean of Faculty at the Paul H. Nitze School of Advanced International Studies at Johns Hopkins University
- James L. McGregor, founder, chairman and CEO of JL McGregor & Company
- Peter McPherson, president of the National Association of State Universities and Land-Grant Colleges
- Tom Pickering, vice chairman at Hills & Company Consulting
- Ko-Yung Tung, senior counselor at Morrison & Foerster
- Tien Chang An, executive vice president of Burson-Marsteller China
- Harry Harding, Faculty Senior Fellow in the Miller Center of Public Affairs at the University of Virginia
- Robert Sutter, Professor of Practice of International Affairs at the George Washington University

=== Special Advisors ===
- King-Kok Cheung, literary critic and Professor at UCLA
- Madelyn Ross, former associate director of China Studies and executive director of SAIS China
- Curtis Sandberg, Founder and Principal Consultant at Apablasa Consulting: Strategic International Engagement Through Culture
- Teresita Schaffer, Senior Advisor on India and South Asia at McClarty Associates and former U.S. Ambassador to Sri Lanka

=== Notable participants ===
Over the years, a variety of notable scholars, politicians, journalists, and other leaders have participated in USCET programs, including the following:

Name	Position	Participation in USCET
Deborah Nelson	Professor at the University of Maryland Philip Merrill School of Journalism, winner of the Pulitzer Prize	2010 Media Education Consortium Journalist-in-Residence
Shai Oster	Reporter at The Wall Street Journal, winner of the Pulitzer Prize	2010 Media Education Consortium Journalist-in-Residence
Haynes Johnson	Pulitzer Prize–winning political journalist, best-selling author, and TV analyst	Keynote Speaker at 2005 Congressional Studies Practicum in Shanghai
Harris Wofford	Former Senator from Pennsylvania	Guest Speaker at 2005 Congressional Studies Practicum in Shanghai
Larry Pressler	Former Senator and Congressman from South Dakota	Guest Speaker at 2005 Congressional Studies Practicum in Shanghai
James A. Thurber	Director of the Center for Congressional and Presidential Studies at American University	Speaker at 2006 People's Congress Legislative Training Program
Frank J. Fahrenkopf, Jr.	Former chairman of the Republican National Committee and current president and CEO of the American Gaming Association	Moderator at 2008 Presidential Campaign program at Shanghai Jiaotong University, Shanghai Institute for International Studies and Tsinghua University
James Fallows	Author and National Correspondent, Atlantic Monthly	Guest panelist at 2006 Congressional Studies Practicum, Central Party School
Jerome A. Cohen	Professor at New York University School of Law, senior fellow for Asia Studies at the Council on Foreign Relations	Giver of the 2002 F.Y. Chang Lecture at Peking University
Jody Freeman	Professor and Director of Harvard Law School Environmental Law Program	Giver of the 2007 F.Y. Chang Lecture at Peking University
Antonin Scalia	Associate Justice of US Supreme Court	Giver of the 2008 F.Y. Chang Lecture at the 20th Anniversary Symposium
Charlene Barshefsky	Former US Trade Representative	Giver of the 2010 F.Y. Chang Lecture at Peking University
Chris Hanson	Professor at the University of Maryland Phillip Merrill College of Journalism, winner of the Pulitzer Prize	Guest lecturer at the 2009 Media Ethics and Law Workshop at Wuhan University
Bernard Gwertzman	Consulting Editor of the Council on Foreign Relations's cfr.org website and former Foreign Editor of The New York Times	2009 Media Education Consortium Journalist-in-Residence
Jonathan Kaufman	Senior Editor of The Wall Street Journal and winner of the Pulitzer Prize	2008 Media Education Consortium Journalist-in-Residence
Gwen Ifill	Managing Editor and Moderator for Washington Week and a Senior Correspondent for The News Hour on PBS	2007 Media Education Consortium Journalist-in-Residence
William Raspberry	Former Pulitzer Prize–winning columnist for The Washington Post	2006 Media Education Consortium Journalist-in-Residence
David Broder	Author, political news commentator, and Pulitzer Prize–winning former columnist for Ihe Washington Post	2004 Media Education Consortium Journalist-in-Residence
Terence Smith	Former correspondent for PBS's The NewsHour, The New York Times, and CBS News, winner of two Emmy Awards	Guest Lecturer for 2006 Financial Media Institute at Fudan University
Al Kamen	Columnist for The Washington Post	Guest Lecturer for 2006 Financial Media Institute at Fudan University
Robert Keatley	Former editor of The Wall Street Journal Asia	Director of 2008 Financial Media Institute at Fudan University
Thomas Easton	Asia Business Editor for The Economist	Guest Lecturer for 2009 Financial Media Institute at Hong Kong Baptist University
Gregg Fields	Economics Editor at Bankrate, inc., member of 1993 Pulitzer Prize for Public Service–winning news team	Guest Lecturer for 2009 Financial Media Institute at Hong Kong Baptist University
Roger Kendall	Former columnist for the Los Angeles Times and winner of the Pulitzer Prize	Guest Lecturer for 2010 "Covering the World Expo" Hands-on Journalism Workshop
Shelley Fisher Fishkin	Director of American Studies, Stanford University	Guest Speaker at 2005 American Studies Network Conference at Yunnan University
Jon Huntsman	Former Governor of Utah and former American Ambassador to China	Guest Speaker at 2009 American Studies Network Conference at Beijing Foreign Studies University
Eddie Glaude	Director of the Center of African American Studies Professor of Religion at Princeton University	Guest Speaker at 2009 American Studies Network Conference at Beijing Foreign Studies University
Frank Lavin	Chairman of Asia Pacific Public Affairs for Edelman Public Relations	Guest Speaker at 2010 American Studies Network Conference at Jiangnan University in Wuxi, China
Carola McGiffert	Senior Advisor to the US State Department Assistant Secretary of State for East Asia and the Pacific and Director of the 100,000 Strong Initiative	Guest Speaker at 2010 American Studies Network Conference at Jiangnan University in Wuxi, China
