= David M. Lampton =

American political scientist

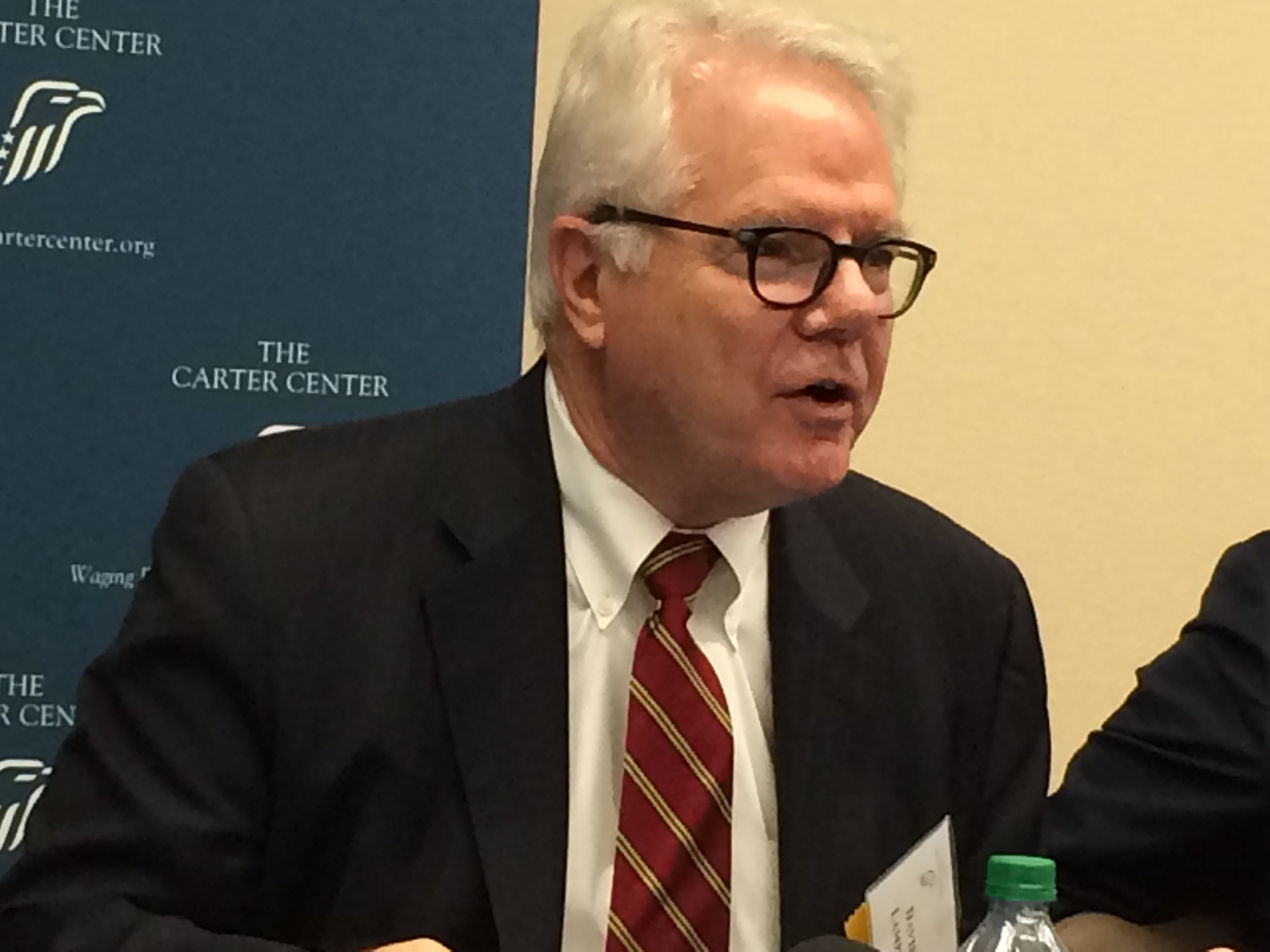
- Lampton in May 2015
- Born: 1946 (age 79–80)
- Education: Stanford University
- Awards: Scalapino Prize Gilman Scholar Sable Award, Journal of Contemporary China
- Scientific career
- Fields: Political science and China
- Workplaces: Johns Hopkins Paul H. Nitze School of Advanced International Studies

David M. Lampton (born 1946) is the George and Sadie Hyman Professor and director of China studies emeritus at the Johns Hopkins University's Paul H. Nitze School of Advanced International Studies (SAIS) and former chairman of The Asia Foundation. He served at SAIS from late 1997 to July 2018, during which time (2004-2012) he also served as a Dean of Faculty. After his retirement, the David M. Lampton chair was established in his honor.

== Career ==
In 1976, Lampton was an early American visitor to China as part of scientific exchanges between the two countries. At the time, exchanges with social scientists had been fraught, and Lampton substituted for an anthropologist who was more politically sensitive since the anthropologist had been expelled from China in 1950. Lampton was regarded as politically safe and viewed as a young expert on China's health care system. Even so, when his name was first submitted for a visa, he was rejected by Beijing. The National Academy of Sciences decried this decision and Beijing relented.

From 1988 to 1997, Lampton was president of the National Committee on United States-China Relations. From May 1998 to May 2006, he also was affiliated with The Nixon Center (now the Center for the National Interest) as the founding director of its Chinese Studies Program. Prior to 1988, Dr. Lampton was founding director of the China Policy Program at the American Enterprise Institute and associate professor of political science at Ohio State University where he started his academic career in 1974. After serving as Oksenberg-Rohlen Fellow at Stanford University's Asia-Pacific Research Center (2019-2020), he returned to SAIS where he is Senior Fellow at the Foreign Policy Institute. In 2020, with co-authors Selina Ho and Cheng-Chwee Kuik, he published Rivers of Iron: Railroads and Chinese Power in Southeast Asia (University of California Press), on PRC high-speed rail construction in eight Southeast Asian states. In 2024, Rowman & Littlefield published his historical memoir entitled Living U.S.-China Relations: From Cold War to Cold War.

Lampton specializes in Chinese domestic politics, leadership, U.S.-China relations, and Chinese foreign policy. He is the author of The Three Faces of Chinese Power: Might, Money, and Minds (2008), which won Honorable Mention in the Asia Society’s Bernard Schwartz Book Award competition for 2009. He received his B.A., M.A., and Ph.D. degrees from Stanford University. He has an honorary doctorate from the Russian Academy of Sciences’ Institute of Far Eastern Studies, awarded during the relatively liberal period under Boris Yeltsin. He is also an Honorary Senior Fellow of the American Studies Institute of the Chinese Academy of Social Sciences and was a Gilman Scholar at Johns Hopkins. On June 17, 2010, The National Bureau of Asian Research and the Woodrow Wilson International Center for Scholars awarded Lampton the inaugural Scalapino Prize, an award established in honor of Asia scholar Robert A. Scalapino. Presented at the 2010 Asia Policy Assembly in Washington, D.C., the award was given to Lampton in recognition of his contributions to America's understanding of the vast changes underway in Asia. He is the recipient of a 2011 Rockefeller Foundation Bellagio "Residency Award." His book, Following the Leader: Ruling China, from Deng Xiaoping to Xi Jinping, was published in January 2014 and a second edition in 2020, both published by University of California Press.

Early in his career his work focused on the politics of medicine in China. Subsequently, edited volumes on policy implementation in post-Mao China and joint work with Kenneth Lieberthal on bureaucratic politics in post-Mao China, established an influential analytic school called “Fragmented Authoritarianism” and the “Bargaining System” in the study of Chinese politics. This approach led Lampton to emphasize field work and interviewing in China, leading to books on foreign and security policy making, planning and management of the Yangzi River Valley, the construction of high-speed railways connecting China to Southeast Asia, and U.S.-China relations. All this work was greatly facilitated once China began its reform and opening policy in the second half of the 1970s. His first trip to China was a month after Mao Zedong’s September 1976 death. In the course of his career he visited China, Hong Kong, and Taiwan well over 150 times.

Lampton is a member of the National Committee on U.S.-China Relations Executive Committee and a member of the Council on Foreign Relations. He served on the board of trustees of Colorado College from 1999 to 2013 and now is a life trustee. He also serves on the advisory boards of the National Bureau of Asian Research and US-China Education Trust. In 2018, he was awarded the “Lifetime Achievement Award for Advancing U.S.-China Relations” by the Committee of 100. He served as enlisted and commissioned officer of the U.S. Army Reserve, was a fireman at Stanford University, and is a member of Phi Beta Kappa and Phi Eta Sigma academic honorary societies.

On February 27, 2014, Lampton was part of a panel discussion sponsored by the US-Asia Institute entitled "Sino-Japan Dynamics and Implications for The U.S.-Japan Alliance." His May 2015 speech at The Carter Center is often cited as the earliest serious warning that U.S.-China relations were in serious decline--"The Tipping Point". A decade later, in the context of strategically worsening relations between Beijing and Washington, Lampton and China’s leading America watcher, Professor Wang Jisi, wrote a joint piece for Foreign Affairs, "America and China at the Edge of Ruin", calling for the two countries’ leaders to take practical measures to arrest the downward trajectory and reap the potential gains of greater cooperation. In his earlier book entitled The Three Faces of Chinese Power (2008), he argued that if America overemphasized Chinese military power, while placing insufficient weight on the PRC’s economic and intellectual growth, it would be struggling in the wrong domain at the wrong time.

In January 2015, Lampton was named the most influential China watcher by the Institute of International Relations at the China Foreign Affairs University in Beijing. Researchers chose him after assessing the credentials of 158 China experts.

In July 2019, Lampton was among the signers of an open letter to the Donald Trump administration and United States Congress which argued that efforts by the United States government to isolate China would weaken "those Chinese intent on developing a more humane and tolerant society."

Publishing in 2020, Lampton and his co-authors of Rivers of Iron write that many Belt and Road Initiative railway projects are initiated by local actors, rather than China's central government.

His memoir, Living U.S.-China Relations: From Cold War to Cold War, draws on his personal records housed in the Rockefeller Archive Center, recounting the many positive features and gains of the engagement period in U.S.-China relations. The volume points out that effectively managing bilateral ties between the U.S. and China requires recognition that it is a society-to-society relationship, not just a state-to-state relationship. Lampton concludes that as America realistically assesses current and future serious challenges, American citizens and the government also ought not to lose sight of the enormous gains to be reaped with greater, broader, and deeper cooperation with China.

== Bibliography ==
- Living U.S.-China Relations: From Cold War to Cold War (2024)
- Rivers of Iron: Railroads and Chinese Power in Southeast Asia, co-author with Selena Ho and Cheng-Chwee Kuik (2020)
- Following the Leader: Ruling China, from Deng Xiaoping to Xi Jinping (2014; reprinted, with a new preface, 2019)
- The Three Faces of Chinese Power: Might, Money, and Minds (2008)
- Same Bed, Different Dreams: Managing U.S.-China Relations, 1989-2000 (2001)
- The Making of Chinese Foreign and Security Policy in the Era of Reform, editor (2001)
- United States and China Relations at a Crossroads, co-editor (1993)
- Bureaucracy, Politics, and Decision-Making in Post-Mao China, co-editor (1992)
- China's Global Presence, co-editor (1988)
- Policy Implementation in Post-Mao China, editor (1987)
- Paths to Power: Elite Mobility in Contemporary China (1986; reprinted in 1989)
- A Relationship Restored, National Academy of Sciences, co-author (1986)
- The Politics of Medicine in China: The Policy Process, 1949-1977, Westview Press (1977)
