= Marquita Maytag =

American heiress and ambassador

United States Ambassador to Nepal
- In office May 18, 1976 – April 22, 1977
- President: Gerald Ford
- Preceded by: William I. Cargo
- Succeeded by: L. Douglas Heck

Personal details
- Born: December 4, 1925 Los Angeles, California, U.S.
- Died: February 15, 2011 (aged 86) Hailey, Idaho, U.S.
- Party: Republican
- Spouse: Lewis Bergman Maytag
- Children: 6 (1 deceased)
- Education: University of California, Los Angeles

Marquita Moseley Maytag (December 4, 1925 – February 15, 2011) was an American heiress who briefly served as the United States ambassador to Nepal from 1976 to 1977.

== Early life and education ==
Maytag was born in Los Angeles in 1925. One of many heirs to the Maytag fortune, she was raised in Hawaii and Sun Valley, Idaho. She attended the University of California, Los Angeles.

== Career ==
An influential political operative in California and Idaho, Maytag was a member of the board of directors of the American Conservative Union from 1969 to 1972. She was also the director of the Grand Central Industrial Center and Regency Galleries in Los Angeles. Maytag was instrumental in switching Idaho delegates from Ronald Reagan to Gerald Ford at the 1976 Republican National Convention. After Ford assumed office as president, Maytag was nominated to serve as United States ambassador to Nepal. During her tenure, Maytag became known for odd behavior.
