= James S. Sutterlin =

American United Nations official

Jim Sutterlin

6th Inspector General of the Department of State
- In office October 15, 1973 – August 31, 1974
- President: Richard Nixon; Gerald Ford
- Preceded by: Thomas McElhiney
- Succeeded by: William E. Schaufele Jr.

9th Director of Policy Planning
- In office September 4, 1973 – October 15, 1973
- President: Richard Nixon
- Preceded by: William Cargo
- Succeeded by: Winston Lord

Personal details
- Born: March 15, 1922; Frankfort, Kentucky, U.S.
- Died: May 8, 2017 (aged 95)
- Education: Haverford College (BA)

James S. Sutterlin (March 15, 1922 – May 8, 2017) was an American author, academic, and officer at the United States Department of State with rank equivalent to an Assistant Secretary of State, who also spent 13 years working in various capacities for the Secretariat of the United Nations. He was Director of Research and adjunct professor at the Long Island University Institute for the Study of International Organizations, and a Distinguished Fellow at International Security Studies, Yale University.

== State Department Career (1973–74) ==
Following his service in the US Army during the second world war, Sutterlin joined the foreign service. He served under President Richard Nixon as Director of Policy Planning in the United States Department of State from September 4, 1973, to October 15, 1973, with the title of Director of the Planning and Coordination Staff, and with rank equivalent to an Assistant Secretary of State. He was then Inspector General of the Department of State from October 15, 1973, to August 31, 1974.

== United Nations ==
Sutterlin spent 13 years working in various capacities for the Secretariat of the United Nations, has authored and co-authored several UN-themed books, and has worked closely with former UN Secretary General Javier Pérez de Cuéllar in drafting the latter's memoirs, Pilgrimage for Peace (1997).

== Academic career ==
Sutterlin was a Chair of the Academic Council on the United Nations System (ACUNS) and the former Director of the Yale-U.N. Oral History Project at UNSY (United Nations Studies at Yale). He was also Director of Research and adjunct professor at the Long Island University Institute for the Study of International Organizations, and a Distinguished Fellow at International Security Studies, Yale University.

== Writings ==
- The United Nations and the Maintenance of International Security: A Challenge to be Met (1995, revised August 2003)
- The United Nations and Iraq: defanging the viper (2003, co-written with Jean E. Krasno)
- The Falklands War (with Sir Anthony Parsons, Enrique Ros, Nicanor Costa Mendez, as part of the Yale-UN Oral history project)
