= Dean R. Thompson =

American diplomat (born 1967)

Dean Thompson
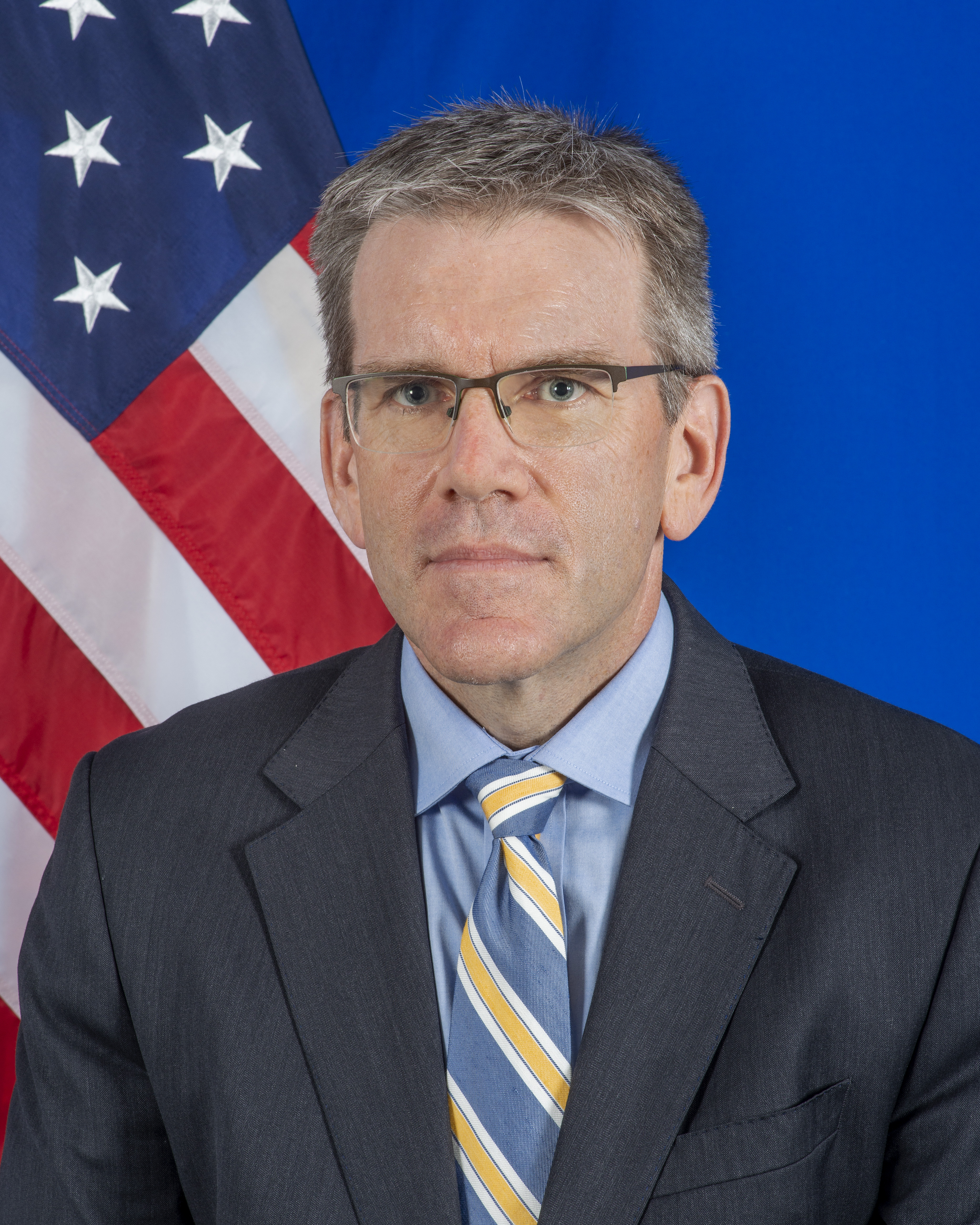

United States Ambassador to Nepal
- In office October 21, 2022 – January 16, 2026
- President: Joe Biden; Donald Trump
- Preceded by: Randy W. Berry

Personal details
- Born: 1967 (age 58–59)
- Education: Wittenberg University (BA); University of Maryland, College Park (MA); National Defense University (MS)

Dean Richard Thompson (born 1967) is an American diplomat who served as the United States ambassador to Nepal starting in October 2022.

== Early life and education ==
Thompson earned a Bachelor of Arts from Wittenberg University, a Master of Arts from the University of Maryland School of Public Policy, and a Master of Science in national security strategy from the National War College of the National Defense University.

== Career ==
Thompson is a career member of the Senior Foreign Service, class of minister-counselor. Since 2021, he has served as the principal deputy assistant secretary for South and Central Asian Affairs within the United States Department of State, and was the acting assistant secretary from 2020 to 2021. Earlier in his career, Thompson has served as consul general of the U.S. Consulate in Kolkata, India. He was the deputy chief of mission of the U.S. Embassy in Kuala Lumpur, Malaysia, and the deputy chief of mission and chargé d'affaires, a.i. of the U.S. Embassy in Bucharest, Romania.

Among other assignments, he served as director of the State Department's Executive Secretariat staff, deputy director of the State Department Operations Center, director of the Operations Center crisis management staff, and deputy director for information resources management for the executive secretariat. Thompson speaks Romanian and Bengali. Prior to joining the Foreign Service, he worked in the Office of the Secretary of Defense on counterproliferation issues and U.S. security assistance to South Korea.

=== United States ambassador to Nepal ===
On March 29, 2022, President Joe Biden announced his intent to nominate Thompson to be the next United States ambassador to Nepal. On April 4, 2022, his nomination was sent to the Senate. Hearings on his nomination were held before the Senate Foreign Relations Committee on July 13, 2022. The committee favorably reported his nomination to the Senate floor on July 19, 2022. His nomination was confirmed by the full Senate on August 5, 2022.

Thompson presented his credentials to President Bidya Devi Bhandari on October 21, 2022.

== Personal life ==
In addition to English, Thompson speaks Romanian and Bengali.

== See also ==
- Ambassadors of the United States

Diplomatic posts
Preceded by Randy W. Berry	United States Ambassador to Nepal; 2022 – 2026	Vacant
