= Randy W. Berry =

American diplomat (born 1965)

Randy Berry
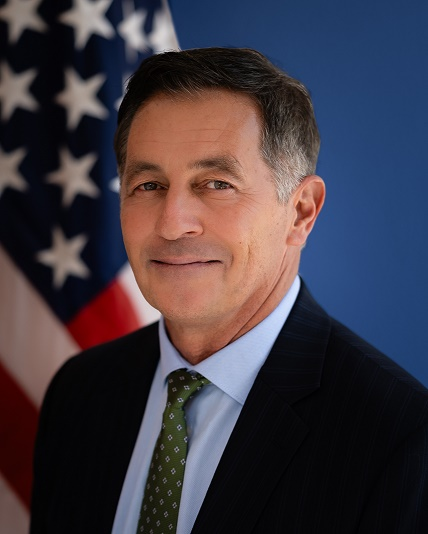

United States Ambassador to Namibia
- In office February 9, 2023 – December 31, 2024
- President: Joe Biden
- Preceded by: Lisa A. Johnson
- Succeeded by: John Giordano

United States Ambassador to Nepal
- In office October 25, 2018 – October 2, 2022
- President: Donald Trump; Joe Biden
- Preceded by: Alaina B. Teplitz
- Succeeded by: Dean R. Thompson

1st United States Special Envoy for the Human Rights of LGBTI Persons
- In office April 13, 2015 – November 2017
- President: Barack Obama; Donald Trump
- Preceded by: Position established
- Succeeded by: Jessica Stern

Personal details
- Born: Randy William Berry; 1965 (age 60–61)
- Spouse: Pravesh Singh
- Children: 2
- Education: Bethany College, Kansas (BA)

Randy William Berry (born 1965) is an American diplomat who has served the United States ambassador to Namibia. He previously served as the United States ambassador to Nepal and the first U.S. special envoy for the human rights of LGBTI persons.

== Early life and education ==
Randy W. Berry was born in 1965 and grew up on his family cattle ranch in Custer County, Colorado.

Berry graduated from Bethany College in Lindsborg, Kansas, receiving a Rotary Scholarship to attend the University of Adelaide in Australia. Besides English, he speaks Spanish and Arabic.

== Career ==
Berry worked for America West Airlines in Phoenix, Arizona, where he was employed as an international training manager. He joined the United States Foreign Service in 1993, serving as a diplomat in Nepal, Bangladesh, Egypt, South Africa, and Uganda. and then served as United States Consul General in Auckland, New Zealand, from 2009 to 2012. He was Consul General in Amsterdam from 2012 to 2015.

Berry served as the Special Envoy for the Human Rights of LGBTI Persons from 2015 to 2017. This position was created after Democratic Congressman Alan Lowenthal of California and Democratic Senator Edward Markey called for it; it was announced by Secretary of State John Kerry in February 2015. Two months later, Berry was appointed to that office. Some analysts suggested Berry should have been appointed to the higher rank of ambassador. At the start of his term, Berry identified his broad goal as "in essence, to strengthen partnerships with countries that are like-minded on the issue, try to make progress in countries that are seemingly on the fence about gay rights, and do what's feasible in countries where there's overt hostility."

In his first year as Special Envoy, Berry traveled to 42 countries in an effort to ensure that LGBTI persons everywhere are afforded equal rights under the law. He has also identified combatting violence and discrimination against LGBTI persons as a key priority for his tenure. He began his term as Special Envoy by focusing on supporting LGBTI rights in South America. He also argued that police resources in repressive homophobic societies like Uganda, infamous for its Kill the Gays bill, should be redirected towards combatting terrorism, not harassing their LGBTI citizens.

Berry's 2015 meeting with Vatican officials from the Holy See's Secretary of State office garnered significant media attention given that the Catholic Church's holds the position that gay and lesbian sexual behavior a sin and restricts marriage to unions of one man and one woman. Berry addressed questions about his engagement at the Vatican by clarifying that "We were not there to talk about issues of civil unions or same-sex marriage, for example, because that is not part of our policy." Instead, Berry said he hoped his meeting with Church officials would highlight "issues of violence and extreme discrimination are of concern to us all."

At the conclusion of his first year in office, on April 20, 2016, Berry briefed reporters at the State Department's daily press briefing to outline his priorities for the second year of his term. During that briefing, he said that one of his major priorities for the coming year would be to combat anti-LBGTI violence around the world and that the State Department "will work" with other branches of the U.S. Government, including the Justice Department and Federal Bureau of Investigation, as well as "other agencies to leverage opportunities to reduce and prevent violence, share best practices and challenges and provide technical resources where we can."

The Obama administration, on January 20, 2017, also named Berry Deputy Assistant Secretary in the Bureau of Democracy, Human Rights, and Labor. On February 13, the State Department announced that Berry would continue in that position as well as that of Special Envoy in the Trump administration. Tony Perkins, head of the Family Research Council, called the appointment "a disappointing development" and said that "Keeping Berry only signals to the world that the extreme agenda of the Obama years is still deeply entrenched in the State Department". The conservative Family Research Council had made removing such "activists" a priority and as recently as December called on the State Department to rid itself of employees who promote an "anti-family, anti-life agenda." A spokesperson for the Trump transition team responded to media outlets saying that any suggestion "that discrimination of any kind will be condoned or tolerated in a Trump administration is simply absurd."

Berry vacated the Special Envoy role in November 2017. The role stayed empty through the end of the Trump administration, but was filled again during the Biden administration with the appointment of Jessica Stern, who took office in September 2021.

=== United States ambassador to Nepal ===
Berry was nominated to be the U.S. Ambassador to Nepal by President Donald Trump in May 2018 and confirmed by the Senate on September 6, 2018. Berry presented his credentials to Nepali President Bidya Devi Bhandari on October 25, 2018. Berry was one of five LGBT appointed ambassadors under the Trump administration. He left the post on October 2, 2022, after the swearing-in of his successor, Dean R. Thompson, and his own confirmation to be the ambassador to Namibia.

=== United States ambassador to Namibia ===
On June 22, 2022, President Joe Biden nominated Berry to be the ambassador to Namibia. Hearings on his nomination were held before the Senate Foreign Relations Committee on July 28, 2022. His nomination was reported favorably out of committee on August 3, 2022, and the nomination was confirmed by the full Senate on September 30, 2022. Berry presented his credentials to President Hage Geingob on February 9, 2023.

== Personal life ==
Berry is married to Pravesh Singh, and together they have a son and a daughter. They reside in Washington, D.C.

== See also ==
- Ambassadors of the United States
- List of LGBT ambassadors of the United States

Diplomatic posts
New office	United States Special Envoy for the Human Rights of LGBTI Persons; 2015–2017	Succeeded by Jessica Stern
Preceded by Alaina B. Teplitz	United States Ambassador to Nepal; 2018–2022	Succeeded by Sepideh Keyvanshad; Chargé d'Affaires
Preceded by Jessica Long; Chargé d'Affaires	United States Ambassador to Namibia; 2023–2024	Succeeded by Brandon Hudspeth; Chargé d'Affaires
