= Carol C. Laise =

American diplomat (1917–1991)

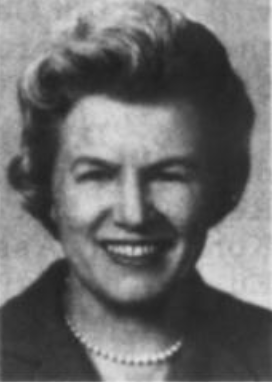

United States Ambassador to Nepal
- In office December 5, 1966 – June 5, 1973
- President: Lyndon B. Johnson; Richard Nixon
- Preceded by: Henry E. Stebbins
- Succeeded by: William I. Cargo

13th Assistant Secretary of State for Public Affairs
- In office October 10, 1973 – March 27, 1975
- President: Richard Nixon; Gerald Ford
- Preceded by: Michael Collins
- Succeeded by: John Reinhardt

14th Director General of the Foreign Service
- In office April 11, 1975 – December 26, 1977
- Preceded by: Nathaniel Davis
- Succeeded by: Harry G. Barnes Jr.

Personal details
- Born: Caroline Clendening Laise; November 14, 1917 Winchester, Virginia, U.S.
- Died: July 25, 1991 (aged 73) Dummerston, Vermont, U.S.
- Spouse: Ellsworth Bunker (m. 1967; died 1984)
- Education: American University (BA); George Washington University (MA)

Caroline Clendening Laise (November 14, 1917 – July 25, 1991) was an American civil servant, ambassador to Nepal and the first female Assistant Secretary of State.

== Early life and education ==
Born in Winchester, Virginia, to Elizabeth Frances (née Stevens) and James Frederic Laise. She received a Bachelor of Arts in public administration in 1938 from American University, where she was a member of the Gamma Delta chapter of Phi Mu fraternity. She later received a Master of Arts in political science from George Washington University in 1940.

== Career ==
Laise began her career in government as a coder for the Civil Service Commission in 1940. She had a position in the United Nations Relief and Rehabilitation Administration for a short time before joining the State Department in 1948. She was an adviser from 1956 to 1961, and in 1962 became deputy director of the Bureau of South Asian Affairs. In 1965, Laise was presented with the Federal Woman's Award.

In 1965, Laise traveled to India and Pakistan as an adviser to Vice President Hubert Humphrey. After a year in New Delhi, President Lyndon B. Johnson named her ambassador to Nepal in 1966, a position she held until 1973. She was the fifth woman to be promoted to ambassador by Johnson.

In October 1973, she became Assistant Secretary of State for Public Affairs, and in 1974 became director general of the Foreign Service, until her retirement in 1977.

== Personal life ==
On January 3, 1967 she married 72-year-old ambassador-at-large Ellsworth Bunker in Kathmandu. Their marriage was the first between two American ambassadors on active duty. Laise continued using her maiden name professionally which was unusual at the time. Later that year, he was named ambassador to South Vietnam and for nearly the first six years of their marriage they only saw each other monthly, via a special government flight offered by President Johnson as enticement for Bunker to accept the post.

She died of cancer in Dummerston, Vermont at the age of 73.

Government offices
Preceded by Michael Collins	Assistant Secretary of State for Public Affairs; October 10, 1973 – March 27, 1975	Succeeded by John Reinhardt
Diplomatic posts
Preceded by Henry Stebbins	United States Ambassador to Nepal; 1966–1973	Succeeded by William Cargo
