= United States Special Envoy for the Human Rights of LGBTI Persons =

US government position on human rights

Special Envoy for the Human Rights of LGBTQI+ Persons
- Seal of the United States Department of State
- Incumbent; Vacant since January 20, 2025
- Appointer: President of the United States
- Inaugural holder: Randy W. Berry
- Formation: April 13, 2015; 11 years ago
- Website: www.state.gov

The special envoy for the human rights of LGBTQI+ persons was a position at the United States Department of State within the Bureau of Democracy, Human Rights and Labor. The office oversaw the United States government's efforts to support the human rights of LGBTQI+ people around the world.

== History ==
The Office was created during the tenure of United States secretary of state John Kerry. The first special envoy was Randy W. Berry, who was sworn in on April 13, 2015, and served until November 2017.

The post was vacant until June 2021, when President Joe Biden announced that he would appoint Jessica Stern to the position.

This position is vacant upon the inauguration of the second Donald Trump administration.

== List ==
No.	Portrait	Officeholder	Term start	Term end	President
1		Randy W. Berry	April 13, 2015	November 2017	Barack Obama
vacant
2		Jessica Stern	September 27, 2021	January 20, 2025	Joe Biden
vacant
