= Asian American and Pacific Islander Heritage Month =

Commemorative month in the United States

- Also called: Asian American, Native Hawaiian, and Pacific Islander Heritage Month
- Observed by: United States
- Type: Secular
- Date: May
- Duration: 1 month
- Frequency: Annual
- First time: 1991; 35 years ago

Asian American and Pacific Islander Heritage Month, alternatively Asian American, Native Hawaiian, and Pacific Islander Heritage Month, is an annually observed commemorative month in the United States. It is celebrated during the month of May, and recognizes the contributions and influence of Asian Americans, Native Hawaiians and other Pacific Islander Americans to the history, culture, and achievements of the United States. This demographic group is collectively referred to as Asian Pacific Americans (APA) or Asian American Pacific Islanders (AAPI).

== Background ==
The first Asians documented in the Americas arrived in 1587, when Filipinos landed in California; from 1898 to 1946, the Philippines was an American possession. The next group of Asians documented in what would be the United States were Indians in Jamestown, documented as early as 1635. In 1778, the first Chinese to reach what would be the United States, arrived in Hawaii. In 1788, the first Native Hawaiian arrived on the continental United States, in Oregon; in 1900, Hawaii was annexed by the United States. (Note: In 1959, Hawaii was granted statehood.) The next group of Asians documented in what would be the United States were Japanese, who arrived in Hawaii in 1806. In 1884, the first Koreans arrived in the United States. In 1898, Guam was ceded to the United States; beginning in the 1900s, Chamorros began to migrate to California and Hawaii. (Note: In 1947 the remainder of the Marianas Islands, which had been occupied by the United States since 1944 during World War II, became part of the United States–administered Trust Territory of the Pacific Islands. In 1975, the Mariana Islands except Guam became the Commonwealth of the Northern Mariana Islands.) In 1904, what is now American Samoa was ceded to the United States; beginning in the 1920s, Samoans began to migrate to Hawaii and the continental United States, with the first Samoans documented in Hawaii in 1920. In 1912, the first Vietnamese was documented in the United States.

== History ==
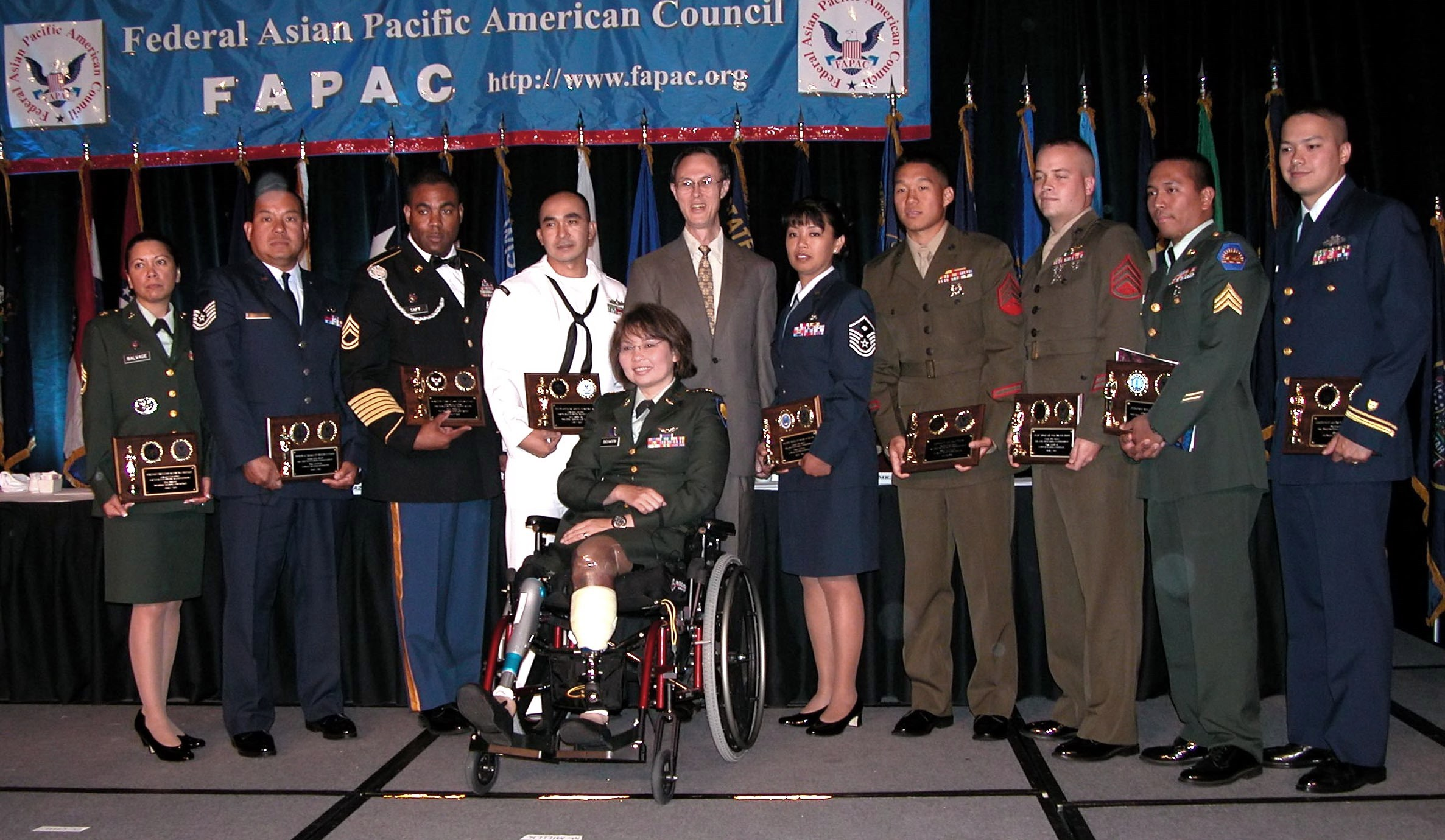
David S. C. Chu and Tammy Duckworth at an Asian Pacific American Heritage Month luncheon in 2005

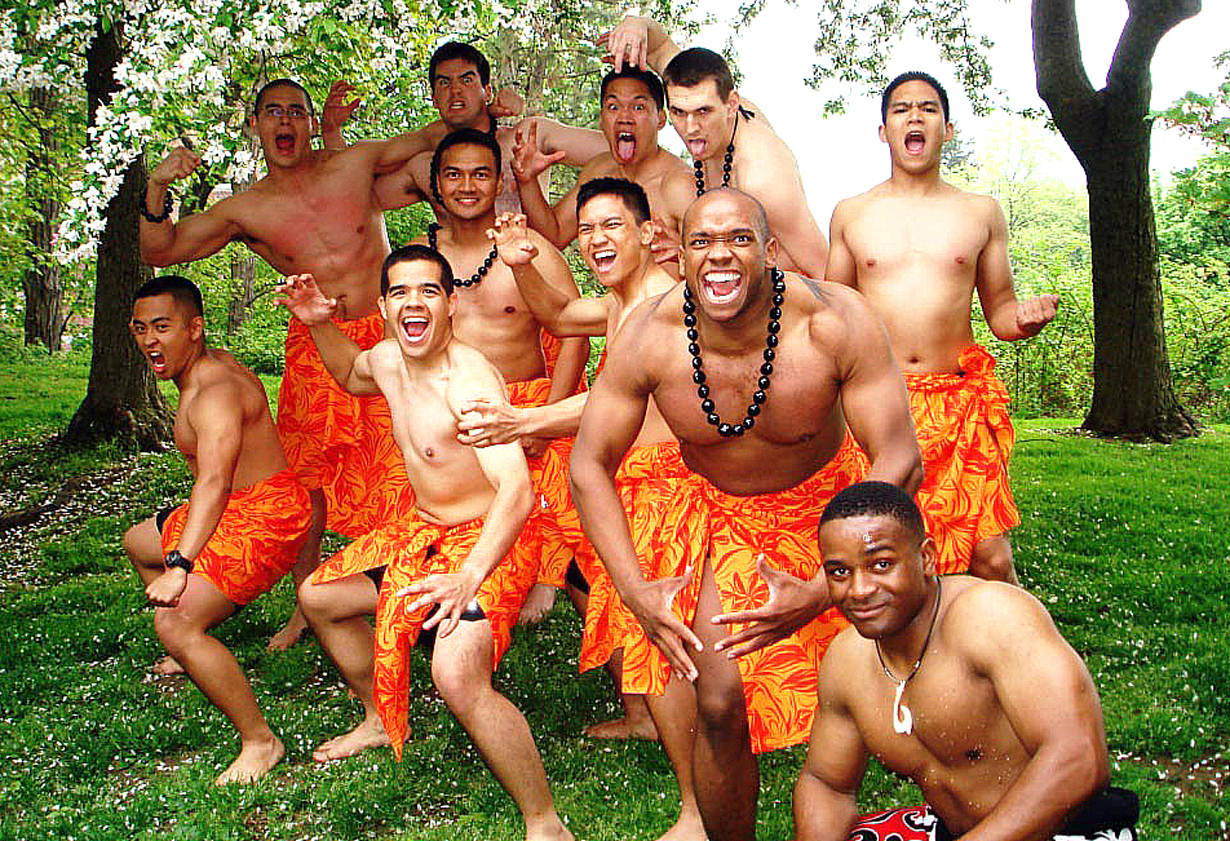
United States Military Academy cadets perform a haka in 2009 during an observance of Asian Pacific American Heritage Month

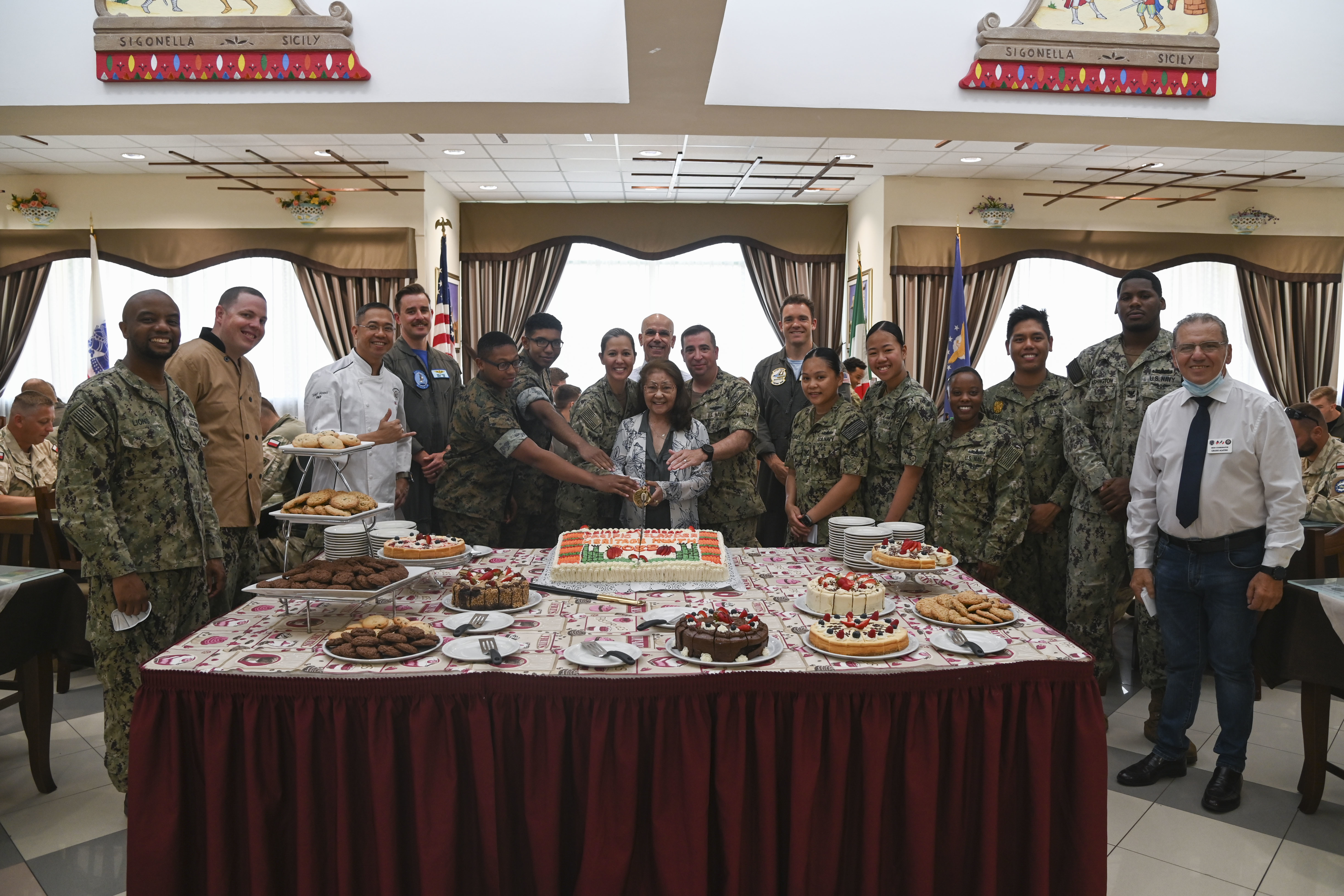
Observance of AAPI Heritage Month at Naval Air Station Sigonella in 2022

Origins on the Asian American and Pacific Islander Heritage Month can be traced to the formation of the Asian American movement, which led AAM to begin material about Asian Americans. The UCLA Asian American Studies Center played a central role in the formation.

A former congressional staffer in the 1970s, Jeanie Jew, first approached Representative Frank Horton with the idea of designating a month to recognize Asian Pacific Americans, following the bicentennial celebrations. In June 1977, Representatives Horton, and Norman Y. Mineta, introduced a United States House of Representatives resolution to proclaim the first ten days of May as Asian-Pacific Heritage Week. A similar bill was introduced in the Senate a month later by Daniel Inouye and Spark Matsunaga.

The proposed resolutions sought that May be designated for two reasons. First, on May 7, 1843, the first Japanese immigrant, Nakahama Manjirō, arrived in the United States. More than two decades later, on May 10, 1869, the golden spike was driven into the first transcontinental railroad, which was completed using Chinese labor.

President Jimmy Carter signed a joint resolution for the celebration on October 5, 1978, to become Public Law 95-419.

In 1990, George H. W. Bush signed a bill passed by Congress to extend Asian-American Heritage Week to a month; May was officially designated as Asian/Pacific American Heritage Month two years later.

On May 1, 2009, President Barack Obama signed Proclamation 8369, recognizing the month of May as Asian American and Pacific Islander Heritage Month.

On April 30, 2021, President Joe Biden signed Proclamation 10189, recognizing the month of May as Asian American, Native Hawaiian and Pacific Islander Heritage Month.

On January 20, 2025, the Trump administration's Initial Rescissions of Harmful Executive Orders and Actions launched attacks on Diversity, equity, and inclusion by revoking his immediate predecessor Joe Biden's Executive Order 14031 of May 28, 2021 (Advancing Equity, Justice, and Opportunity for Asian Americans, Native Hawaiians, and Pacific Islanders). The White House Initiative on Asian Americans, Native Hawaiians, and Pacific Islanders was subsequently dissolved. Nonetheless, on May 16, 2025 and May 2, 2026, the proclamations were issued after all.

== Geographic scope ==
The event is designed for people with heritage from areas which are designated on the US census as Asian American or Pacific Islander American, including South Asia, Southeast Asia, East Asia and the Pacific Islands/Oceania. It covers countries of origin such as China, Japan, Taiwan, Korea, Indonesia, the Philippines, Singapore, Samoa, Thailand, and Vietnam; and in South Asia, India, Pakistan, Bangladesh, Sri Lanka, Nepal, and Bhutan. Indigenous Australians are also included, as they are categorized under the Pacific Islander American umbrella, along with the separate Australian native group of Torres Strait Islanders, who are considered Melenasians. The Pacific Islander American umbrella does not include people of European origin from Australia, or people of European origin from other locations in the Pacific, such as Hawaii, New Zealand, Ecuador's Galápagos Islands and Russia's Sakhalin and Kuril Islands. Russians of European origin from the Far East Asian regions of the country are also excluded from the Asian American category. Indigenous peoples of the Aleutian Islands do not fall within the AAPI category, due to being considered Alaskan Natives rather than Pacific Islander Americans. However, the area is sometimes referenced in broader AAPI month dialogue, since it was invaded by the Japanese during the Pacific War.

The Asian American category has historically not included people of Middle Eastern descent, who prior to 2024 were categorized as White Americans, before being given a distinct category of their own called MENA (Middle East North Africa).

== Observances ==
During Asian Pacific American Heritage Month, communities celebrate the achievements and contributions of Asian and Pacific Americans with community festivals, government-sponsored activities and educational activities for students. The Library of Congress, National Archives and Records Administration, National Endowment for the Humanities, National Gallery of Art, National Park Service, Smithsonian Institution and United States Holocaust Memorial Museum offer resources, toolkits, and other resources to help people observe the month.
