= Peter Berkowitz =

American political scientist and legal scholar (born 1959)

31st Director of Policy Planning
- In office January 1, 2019 – January 20, 2021
- President: Donald Trump
- Preceded by: Kiron Skinner
- Succeeded by: Salman Ahmed

Personal details
- Born: 1959 (age 66–67)
- Party: Republican
- Education: Swarthmore College (BA); Hebrew University of Jerusalem (MA); Yale University (PhD, JD)

Peter Berkowitz (born 1959) is an American political scientist and legal scholar. In 2019–2021, he served as the Director of Policy Planning at the United States Department of State. He currently serves as the Tad and Dianne Taube Senior Fellow at the Hoover Institution of Stanford University and as director of studies for The Public Interest Fellowship. He is also a member of the American Academy of Science and Letters and a columnist for RealClearPolitics.

== Early life and education ==
Berkowitz was born to a Jewish family and spent his childhood in Deerfield, Illinois. He graduated from Swarthmore College with a Bachelor of Arts in English literature in 1981 with high honors and earned a Master of Arts in philosophy with distinction from the Hebrew University of Jerusalem in 1985. He then completed graduate studies at Yale University, completing a Ph.D. in political science with distinction in 1987, and earned his Juris Doctor (J.D.) from Yale Law School in 1990.

== Career ==
Berkowitz taught constitutional law and jurisprudence at the Antonin Scalia Law School from 1999 to 2007, and political philosophy in the Department of Government at Harvard University from 1990 to 1999.

In 1997, after Harvard University president Neil Rudenstine rejected the Department of Government's recommendation and denied his tenure, Berkowitz challenged the process by which Rudenstine reached his decision through Harvard's internal grievance procedure. Eventually, in 2000, he brought a lawsuit for breach of contract against Harvard, alleging flaws in both the tenure review process and the grievance procedure. In 2003, the Massachusetts Supreme Judicial Court dismissed his case.

He is co-founder and director of the Israel Program on Constitutional Government and is a member of the policy advisory board at the Ethics and Public Policy Center. He sits on the board of directors of the National Association of Scholars. He has defended George W. Bush and neoconservative policies. Berkowitz formerly served on the foreign policy advisory team in the Rudy Giuliani 2008 presidential campaign. Berkowitz is the Tad and Dianne Taube senior fellow at the Hoover Institution, Stanford University.

=== Trump administration ===
On January 1, 2019, Berkowitz became the Director of Policy Planning in the first Trump administration.

In October 2020 he tested positive for coronavirus following meetings with senior officials at 10 Downing Street and the Foreign Office in London, and with officials in Budapest and Paris. Some U.S. State Department officials were angered by Berkowitz's trip, arguing that it was unnecessary.

During his tenure at the State Department, Berkowitz served as executive secretary to the Commission on Unalienable Rights. During Berkowitz's tenure, the Commission produced a Report of the Commission on Unalienable Rights, which emphasizes America's dedication to inalienable rights — the rights shared by all people — and the foundations of human rights that can be found across cultures throughout the world.

Under Berkowitz's supervision, the Policy Planning Staff produced an unclassified paper, The Elements of the China Challenge, which described the reasons for Secretary of State Mike Pompeo's focus on great power competition with China.

=== Author and columnist ===
Following his tenure at the State Department, Berkowitz resumed his duties at the Hoover Institution and became a columnist at RealClearPolitics. He also writes for other publications and is the author of several books on political philosophy and on international law, most recently Constitutional Conservatism (Hoover Press, 2013).

=== Professor and lecturer ===
In addition to teaching regularly in the United States and Israel, Berkowitz has led seminars on the principles of freedom and the American constitutional tradition for students from Burma at the George W. Bush Presidential Center and for Korean students at Underwood International College at Yonsei University in Seoul, South Korea. In 2017, Berkowitz was awarded the Bradley Prize. Berkowitz delivered the 2018 Scalia Lecture, "Liberal Education, Law, and Liberal Democracy," at Harvard Law School.

== Bibliography ==
- Nietzsche: The Ethics of an Immoralist (Harvard University Press, 1995).
- Virtue and the Making of Modern Liberalism (Princeton University Press, 1999).
- Never a Matter of Indifference: Sustaining Virtue in a Free Republic, editor (Hoover Institution Press, 2003).
- Varieties of Conservatism in America, editor (Hoover Institution Press, 2004).
- Varieties of Progressivism in America, editor (Hoover Institution Press, 2004)
- The Future of American Intelligence, editor (Hoover Institution Press, 2005)
- Terrorism, the Laws of War, and the Constitution: Debating the Enemy Combatant Cases, editor (Hoover Institution Press, 2005).
- Constitutional Conservatism: Liberty, Self-Government, and Political Moderation, (Hoover Institution Press, 2013).

Berkowitz has co-edited the Hoover Studies in Politics, Economics, and Society book series with Tod Lindberg since 2005.
