= Julia Chang Bloch =

American diplomat

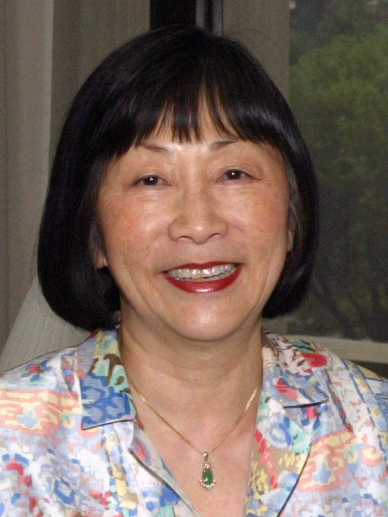

United States Ambassador to Nepal
- In office September 22, 1989 – May 20, 1993
- President: George H. W. Bush; Bill Clinton
- Preceded by: Milton Frank
- Succeeded by: Michael Malinowski

Personal details
- Born: 1942 (age 83–84) Yantai, Republic of China
- Education: University of California, Berkeley; Harvard University

Julia Chang Bloch (Chinese: 張之香; pinyin: Zhāng Zhīxiāng; born 1942) is a Chinese American businessperson and diplomat, who was the first U.S. ambassador of Asian descent. She is the founder and executive chair of the US-China Education Trust.

== Life and political career ==
Bloch was born in Yantai (then known in English as Chefoo), Shandong Province, China, and moved to the US when she was nine. Her father was the first Chinese graduate of Harvard Law School, where he was classmates with Massachusetts senator Leverett Saltonstall. Saltonstall helped pass a law to allow her entire family to emigrate from Hong Kong to the US. She grew up in San Francisco, where she attended Lowell High School, and earned a Bachelor's degree in Communications and Public Policy from the University of California, Berkeley, in 1964, and a master's degree in Government and East Asia Regional Studies from Harvard University in 1967. She served as a Peace Corps Volunteer in Sabah, Malaysia from 1964-1965. From 1971 she was a staffer for the Senate Select Committee on Nutrition and Human Needs, and thereafter worked in a number of other roles, including administering a food-aid program. She was appointed ambassador to Nepal by President George H. W. Bush in 1989, a post she held until 1993. In 1993, Bloch left the public sector to become a group executive vice president at Bank of America, where she created the corporate relations department, heading the bank's public relations, government affairs and public policy operations. In 2007, Bloch served as National Co-Chair of Asian Pacific Americans for Mitt during Mitt Romney's 2008 presidential campaign.

== Philanthropy and education work ==
During her career Bloch has engaged in a variety of non-profit educational endeavors, the majority of which sought to promote educational and cultural exchange between the US and China. In 1988, she and her husband Stuart Marshall Bloch established the F.Y. Chang Foundation in honor of Bloch's father, Chang Fuyun, the first Chinese national to graduate from Harvard Law School. The foundation currently offers scholarships to Chinese students to study at Harvard Law. From 1996-1998, Bloch was president and CEO of the United States-Japan Foundation. In 1998, she turned her energies back toward China, first serving for a year as a visiting professor at the Institute for International Relations of the American Studies Center at Peking University. At this time, Bloch became an advocate for expanding academic collaborations between Chinese and American universities, and in particular for expanding the role of American Studies programs on Chinese university campuses, and simultaneously served as executive vice chairman of Peking University's American Studies Center.

Soon afterwards she founded the US-China Education Trust, an educational non-profit which sponsors education and exchange programs for Chinese and American students and scholars. The nonprofit held its first collaborative program, an academic workshop on the US Congress, at Fudan University in 2001. Bloch currently serves as Executive Chair of the US-China Education Trust.

Diplomatic posts
Preceded by Milton Frank	United States Ambassador to Nepal; 1989–1993	Succeeded by Michael Malinowski
