= William I. Cargo =

American diplomat

William Cargo

United States Ambassador to Nepal
- In office 1973–1976
- President: Gerald Ford
- Preceded by: Carol Laise
- Succeeded by: Marquita Maytag

8th Director of Policy Planning
- In office 1969–1973
- President: Richard Nixon
- Preceded by: Henry David Owen
- Succeeded by: James S. Sutterlin

Personal details
- Born: William Ira Cargo; February 27, 1917 Detroit, Michigan, U.S.
- Died: December 13, 2005 (aged 88) Baltimore, Maryland, U.S.
- Education: Albion College (BA); University of Michigan (PhD)

Military service
- Branch/service: United States Navy
- Battles/wars: World War II

William Ira Cargo (February 27, 1917 – December 13, 2005) was an American diplomat and foreign policy advisor who served as the United States Ambassador to Nepal from 1973 to 1976. Cargo had previously served as the Director of Policy Planning from 1969 to 1973.

== Early life and education ==
Cargo was born in Detroit and raised around Michigan, the son of a Methodist minister. Cargo graduated from Fenton High School in 1933. He earned a Bachelor of Arts degree from Albion College and a PhD in political science from University of Michigan. Cargo completed his dissertation on Palestine. As a graduate student, Cargo also contributed to articles published in the American Political Science Review.

== Career ==
After earning his doctorate, Cargo worked as a professor at the University of Michigan and Colorado College. After the Attack on Pearl Harbor, Cargo applied for a position in the United States Navy, but instead joined the Division of Research and Publication in the United States Department of State. After being drafted in 1944, he served in the United States Navy Reserve and was trained in Florida and assigned to the Navy Communications Annex.

After his discharge, he returned to the Department of State. Cargo worked in the Office of Dependent Area Affairs and was selected to attend the National War College in 1953 and 1954. He became a member of the United States Foreign Service in 1954 and was assigned to the U.S. embassy in France. He then returned to Washington, D.C., working in the Bureau of International Organization Affairs. Cargo also worked with the United Nations and participated in the Strategic Arms Limitation Talks. He later served as Deputy U.S. Representative to the International Atomic Energy Agency and was assigned to the U.S. embassy in Pakistan. He served as the Deputy U.S. Representative to NATO before again returning to Washington. From 1969 to 1973, he served as the Director of Policy Planning under Richard Nixon. From 1973 to 1976, he served as United States Ambassador to Nepal. Cargo continued to serve as an advisor to the Department of State before his official retirement.

== Personal life ==
Cargo and his wife, Margaret, had two children and lived in Columbia, Maryland. Cargo died on December 13, 2005, in Baltimore at the age of 88.
