= Lawrence G. Rossin =

American diplomat (1952-2012)

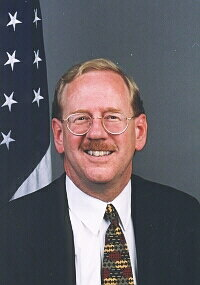
Ambassador Lawrence G. Rossin

Lawrence George Rossin (November 3, 1952 – October 6, 2012) was an American career foreign service officer who served as Ambassador Extraordinary and Plenipotentiary to Croatia from 2000 until 2003.

Born in Newark and raised in Santa Maria, California, Rossin graduated from Claremont McKenna College in 1975 with a degree in Economics.

Rossin joined the State Department in 1975. Some of his positions included deputy chief of mission in Spain from 1995 to 1998, director of south central European affairs at the State Department from 1998 to 1999 and chief of mission in Kosovo before serving as ambassador to Croatia from 2001 to 2003. From 2008 until his retirement in 2011, Rossin was deputy assistant secretary general for operations at NATO, providing policy support for NATO military operations. Kofi Annan appointed him to be Principal Deputy Special Representative of the Secretary-General for the United Nations Stabilization Mission in Haiti effective March 2, 2006.

Rossin died at his home in Rockville, Maryland due to multiple myeloma.

Diplomatic posts
Preceded by William D. Montgomery	United States Ambassador to Croatia; 2001–2003	Succeeded by Ralph Frank
