= L. Douglas Heck =

American diplomat

11th United States Ambassador to Nepal
- In office July 27, 1977 – May 19, 1980
- Preceded by: Marquita Maytag
- Succeeded by: T. Jefferson Coolidge

1st Coordinator for Counterterrorism
- In office August 29, 1976 – June 6, 1977
- Succeeded by: Heyward Isham

6th United States Ambassador to Niger
- In office March 22, 1974 – July 20, 1976
- Preceded by: Roswell D. McClelland
- Succeeded by: Charles A. James

United States Ambassador to Cyprus
- In office August 16, 1960 – August 27, 1960; Acting
- Succeeded by: Fraser Wilkins

Personal details
- Born: December 14, 1918 Cedarville, Ohio, U.S.
- Died: January 13, 1993 (aged 74) Madras, India
- Education: Yale University
- Profession: Diplomat

Louis Douglas Heck (December 14, 1918 – January 13, 1993) was an American diplomat and State Department official.

Heck was born in Bern, Switzerland, to American parents. After graduating with a B.A. from Yale University in 1941, he joined the State Department's the newly established Division of World Trade Intelligence in 1943. From 1945 to 1952, he was assistant chief and later chief of the Biographic Information Division. In 1952, he became acting director of the Office of Library Information.

He joined the United States Foreign Service in 1952. His first assignment was as a political officer in Calcutta from 1953 to 1959, when he became Deputy Chief of Mission in Nicosia. During his tenure, Cyprus declared independence on August 16, 1960, and the United States recognized the new country that same day. Heck served as chargé d'affaires ad interim of the newly created U.S. Embassy until the appointment of Fraser Wilkins as the first Ambassador to Cyprus eleven days later. He subsequently returned to India, working as counselor of political affairs in New Delhi from 1962 until 1965 and Country Director for India, Ceylon, Nepal, and the Maldives from 1966 to 1968. He was Consul General in Istanbul from 1968 until 1970 and Deputy Chief of Mission in Iran from 1970 to 1974. In 1974, President Richard Nixon appointed him Ambassador to the Republic of Niger. He presented his credentials on May 30, 1974. His service terminated on July 20, 1976, due to his appointment as the first Coordinator for Counterterrorism, a post with the dual rank of Ambassador-at-large and Assistant Secretary. On May 3, 1977, President Jimmy Carter appointed Heck to be Ambassador to Nepal, a role he held until his retirement from the Foreign Service on May 19, 1980.

Heck was married twice, first to Elizabeth, with whom he had two children, then to Ernestine (née Sherman). He received the State Department's Distinguished Service Award in 1974. After his retirement from the State Department, he lived in Madras, India, where he died of Parkinson's disease on January 13, 1993.
