= Surveillance Detection Unit =

Surveillance Detection Units (SDU) are organizations belonging to the US government that have conducted secret surveillance that potentially broke national laws in various European countries. The SDUs were publicly discussed in Congress in 2000 and the Norwegian broadcaster TV 2 first publicly reported the existence of the network of SDUs, on 3 November 2010.

== Description ==
In the year 2000, at least 22 United States (US) embassies and consulates around the world operated the US Department of State's "worldwide surveillance detection program", which "[emphasised] quasi-covert operations and information gathering." The SDU operates under the authority of the RSO (Regional Security Officer) and stores the collected data in a system called Security Incident Management Analysis System (SIMAS).

== Norway ==
Since 2000, former leaders of the police force of Oslo, the Norwegian Police Security Service, and the National Criminal Investigation Service have been recruited to conduct secret surveillance of Norwegians in order to prevent terrorist attacks on the U.S. Embassy and the residence of the U.S. Ambassador. The unit consists of 15–20 people that were based on the sixth floor of the building Handelsbygningen at Solli Plass, several hundred metres from the embassy at Henrik Ibsens Gate, until the November 2010 controversy. Its leader, Olaf Johansen, was a former anti-terrorism chief before being recruited for the American unit. Knut Storberget, Norway's Minister of Justice, initially claimed the government was unaware of the program and that there would be an investigation, but later presented updated information to the Norwegian parliament after the U.S. Embassy stated that notification had been made.

Norway television channel TV 2 claimed that the SDU's surveillance of Norwegian citizens was illegal. The head of the Norwegian surveillance agency, Datatilsynet, Bjørn Erik Thon, said that the operation was unprecedented, stating "I think it's very serious that something like this can be conducted on Norwegian territory and that it's Norwegian citizens carrying out the work." Thon stated that the SDU violated the Norwegian privacy law Personopplysningsloven. He said that he was disturbed "that the Norwegians employed by the embassy to, for example, take photos of persons engaging in political demonstrations, apparently have felt they can avoid the law because they were working for a foreign employer."

Parliamentary reactions ranged from "To the degree [it's] true, it's frightening information" from Conservative Party parliamentarian André Oktay Dahl to a "scandal" for Socialist Left Party parliamentarians. Foreign Minister Jonas Gahr Støre took up the surveillance issue with State Secretary Hillary Clinton in a meeting on 7 December.

== Finland ==
In late 2010, the Finnish Security Intelligence Service (Supo/FSIS) initially stated that it was unaware of an SDU at the US Embassy in Helsinki, Finland. The following week, SUPO stated that it was aware of US Embassy surveillance work, that the surveillance was legal and that it had consulted with the embassy. The US Embassy stated that it does have an SDU unit in operation and that the unit does not carry out espionage.

== Germany ==
The German government initially said that it was unaware of the SDU program, but in December confirmed that the groups were providing security for U.S. installations and that some German security experts were part of them. A statement signed by Ole Schröder, Secretary of State in the Ministry of the Interior, said that such measures were understandable in view of the security threat.

== Iceland ==
A US Embassy SDU in Reykjavík, Iceland has been "broadening security surveillance beyond the embassy building and into the immediate surrounding area." The Icelandic Foreign Office stated that it had found no records of the SDU operations having been discussed with Icelandic authorities. The Vice-Chairperson of the Left-Green Movement parliamentary group Álfheiður Ingadóttir, asked for the SDU to be investigated.

== Sweden ==
Shortly after the initial report in Norway, the Swedish government confirmed that similar secret surveillance of residents of Stockholm had been sponsored by the U.S. Embassy there, and Justice Minister Beatrice Ask said that the authorities had yet to be adequately informed. She described the situation as "very serious". The Finnish newspaper Helsingin Sanomat referred to 2000 Swedes under surveillance by the US Embassy's SDU in Stockholm.
