= Director of Policy Planning =

Position of the United States Department of State

- Seal of the United States Department of State
- Appointer: United States Secretary of State
- Inaugural holder: George F. Kennan
- Formation: 1947
- Website: Official website

The director of policy planning is the United States Department of State official in charge of the department's internal think tank, the policy planning staff, with a rank equivalent to assistant secretary. The position has traditionally been held by many members of the U.S. foreign policy establishment. Former directors of policy planning include two national security advisors, a president of the World Bank, and several presidents of the Council on Foreign Relations.

== Directors of policy planning ==
No.	Name	Assumed office	Left office	President appointed by
1	George F. Kennan	1947	1949	Harry S. Truman
2	Paul Nitze	1950	1953	Harry S. Truman
3	Robert R. Bowie	1953	1957	Dwight D. Eisenhower
4	Gerard C. Smith	1957	1961	Dwight D. Eisenhower
5	George C. McGhee	1961	1961	John F. Kennedy
6	Walt Whitman Rostow	1961	1966	John F. Kennedy
7	Henry David Owen	1966	1969	Lyndon B. Johnson
8	William I. Cargo	1969	1973	Richard Nixon
9	James S. Sutterlin	1973	1973	Richard Nixon
10	Winston Lord	1973	1977	Gerald Ford
11	Anthony Lake	1977	1981	Jimmy Carter
12	Paul Wolfowitz	1981	1982	Ronald Reagan
13	Stephen W. Bosworth	1983	1984	Ronald Reagan
14	Peter W. Rodman	1984	1986	Ronald Reagan
15	Richard H. Solomon	1986	1989	Ronald Reagan
16	Dennis B. Ross	1989	1992	George H. W. Bush
17	Samuel W. Lewis	1993	1994	Bill Clinton
18	James Steinberg	1994	1996	Bill Clinton
19	Gregory B. Craig	1997	1999	Bill Clinton
20	Morton Halperin	1998	2001	Bill Clinton
21	Richard N. Haass	2001	2003	George W. Bush
22	Mitchell Reiss	2003	2005	George W. Bush
23	Stephen D. Krasner	2005	2007	George W. Bush
24	David F. Gordon	2007	2009	George W. Bush
25	Anne-Marie Slaughter	2009	2011	Barack Obama
26	Jake Sullivan	2011	2013	Barack Obama
27	David McKean	2013	2016	Barack Obama
28	Jonathan Finer	2016	2017	Barack Obama
29	Brian Hook	2017	2018	Donald Trump
30	Kiron Skinner	2018	2019	Donald Trump
31	Peter Berkowitz	2019	2021	Donald Trump
32	Salman Ahmed	2021	2025	Joe Biden
33	Michael Anton	2025	2025	Donald Trump
34	Michael Needham	2025	2026	Donald Trump
35	Jeremy Lewin	2026	2026	Donald Trump
