= Jessica Stern (diplomat) =

American diplomat

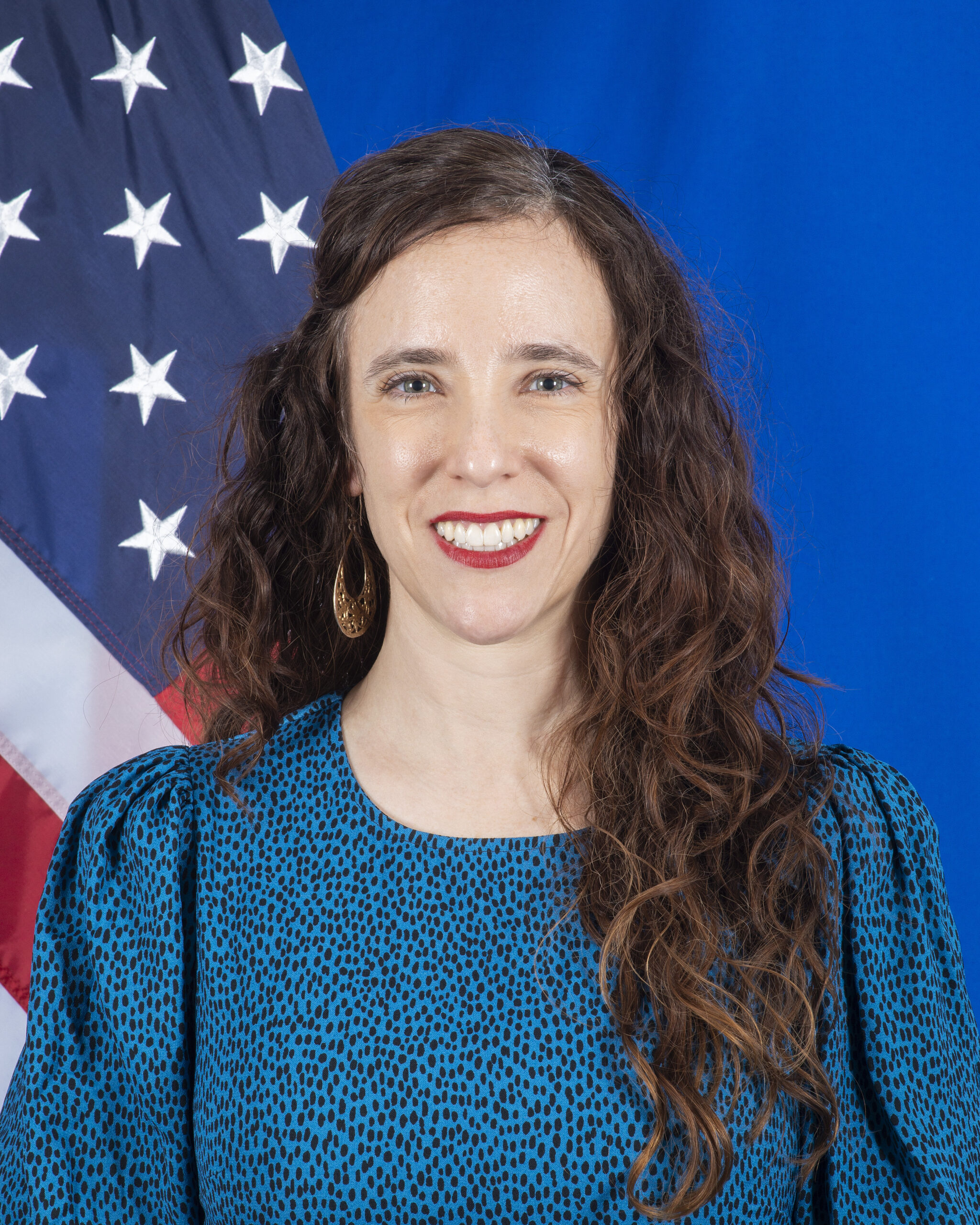
- Stern in 2021

2nd United States Special Envoy for the Human Rights of LGBTQI Persons
- In office September 27, 2021 – January 20, 2025
- President: Joe Biden
- Preceded by: Randy W. Berry

Personal details
- Education: London School of Economics

Jessica Stern is an American diplomat who served as the second United States special envoy for the human rights of LGBTQI persons from 2021 to 2025. She was previously the executive director of Outright International for ten years.

== Life ==
Stern grew up in a Jewish family within a predominantly Christian community in Setauket, New York. She stated that her understanding of human rights developed through her exploration of her Jewish identity and that she learned to be an LGBTQ activist through her Jewishness.

Stern completed a master's degree in human rights at the London School of Economics.

Stern worked in Philadelphia as a welfare rights community organizer. With the Center for Constitutional Rights, she campaigned for electoral reform following the 2000 United States presidential election. Stern was a researcher and advocate at Human Rights Watch and Amnesty International. She was a founding member of the United Nations (UN) LGBTI core group and of its secretariat. Stern successfully campaigned for the first UN General Assembly resolution to include gender identity and for successive Human Rights Council resolutions on sexual orientation and gender identity, leading to the establishment of the independent expert on sexual orientation and gender identity. Stern provided the first LGBTQI+ rights expert testimony in an Arria formula meeting.

Stern joined the International Gay and Lesbian Human Rights Commission (later renamed OutRight International) as its director of programs. After working in that role for two years, in late 2011, she became the acting executive director following departure of Cary Alan Johnson. In 2012, she officially assumed the position, serving in the role for ten years. She helped the organization secure UN observer status, release human rights reports annually, built the world's largest COVID LGBTQI+ grant-making program, and quintupled the budget. Stern highlighted the importance of IGLHRC's alliances with Jewish organizations, specifically mentioning the American Jewish World Service (AJWS) as a key partner.

During Pride Month in 2021, Stern was appointed by U.S. president Joe Biden as the second U.S. special envoy for the human rights of LGBTI persons. She assumed the role on September 27, 2021. She leads U.S. efforts to protect LGBTQI+ persons globally from violence and discrimination. As an adjunct associate professor, Stern taught the first LGBTQI+ rights course at the School of International and Public Affairs, Columbia University.

As of 2012, Stern lived in Brooklyn with her partner, Lisa Davis, a clinical law professor at CUNY School of Law.

As of 2021, Stern has lived in the United States, Mexico, the United Kingdom, and Uruguay.

She ceased to serve in this capacity upon the inauguration of the Donald Trump government.
