= Paul Bracken =

American political scientist

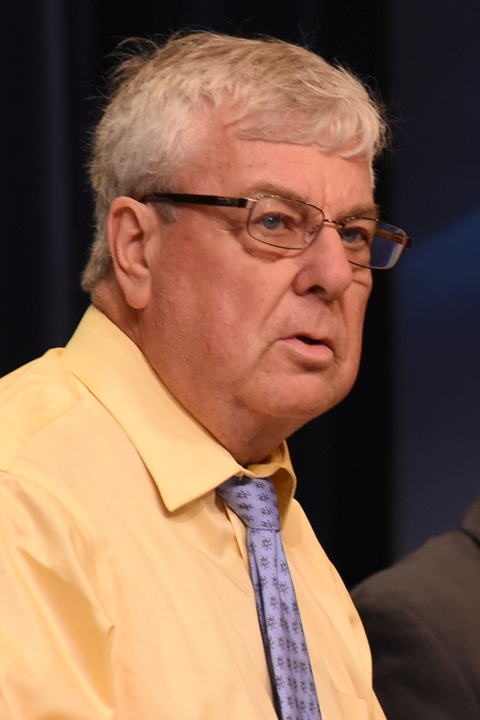
Paul Bracken in 2016

Paul Bracken is a professor of political science and business at Yale University. He received his Bachelor of Science (Engineering) degree from Columbia University and his PhD in Operations Research from Yale University.

== Career ==
Bracken is a former employee of the Hudson Institute and served as a chronicler during the ultra secret 1983 war game code-named Proud Prophet.

The Princeton Review called him one of the United States best 300 professors in 2012.

== Publications ==
=== Articles ===
- New Technology and World Order, Lawrence Livermore National Laboratory, in Strategic Latency: Managing the National and International Security: Consequences of Disruptive Technologies (2018).
- The 2018 Nuclear Posture Review: Signaling Restraint with Stipulations, Foreign Policy Research Institute e-note, Issue February 2018 (2018).

=== Books ===
- The Second Nuclear Age: Strategy, Danger, and the New Power Politics (2012).
- Managing strategic surprise: lessons from risk management and risk assessment. Paul Bracken, Ian Bremmer and David Gordon (2008).
