= List of ambassadors of the United States to Nepal =

Ambassador of the United States to Nepal
- Seal of the United States Department of State

- Incumbent; Megan Bouldin; Chargé d'affaires since September 7, 2026
- Nominator: The president of the United States
- Appointer: The president; with Senate advice and consent
- Inaugural holder: Henry Grady as Ambassador
- Formation: August 6, 1959
- Website: U.S. Embassy - Kathmandu

The United States ambassador to Nepal is the official representative of the government of the United States to the government of Nepal.

== List of US ambassadors to Nepal ==
Name	Term start	Term end
Henry Grady	May 3, 1948	June 22, 1948
Loy Henderson	December 3, 1948	September 21, 1951
Chester Bowles	February 16, 1952	March 23, 1953
George Allen	July 5, 1953	November 30, 1954
John Cooper	June 3, 1955	April 23, 1957
Ellsworth Bunker	March 8, 1957	November 25, 1959
Henry E. Stebbins	November 25, 1959	June 10, 1966
Carol Laise	December 5, 1966	June 5, 1973
William I. Cargo	September 28, 1973	April 3, 1976
Marquita Maytag	May 18, 1976	April 22, 1977
L. Douglas Heck	July 29, 1977	May 19, 1980
Philip Trimble	July 10, 1980	February 21, 1981
Carl Coon	July 3, 1981	August 3, 1984
Leon Weil	September 21, 1984	November 11, 1987
Milton Frank	April 22, 1988	September 16, 1989
Julia Chang Bloch	September 22, 1989	May 20, 1993
Michael Malinowski	May 20, 1993	April 7, 1994
Sandra Vogelgesang	April 7, 1994	July 11, 1997
Ralph Frank	November 4, 1997	August 10, 2001
Michael E. Malinowski	December 11, 2001	April 23, 2004
James Moriarty	July 16, 2004	May 22, 2007
Nancy Powell	July 16, 2007	March 12, 2010
Scott DeLisi	June 14, 2010	June 24, 2012
Peter Bodde	September 10, 2012	September 15, 2015
Alaina Teplitz	October 7, 2015	August 8, 2018
Randy Berry	October 25, 2018	October 2, 2022
Dean R. Thompson	October 21, 2022	January 16, 2026

== See also ==
- Nepal – United States relations
- Foreign relations of Nepal
- Ambassadors of the United States
