= Policy Planning Staff (United States) =

U.S. Department of State agency

The Policy Planning Staff (sometimes referred to as the Policy Planning Council, as the Office of Policy Planning, or by its in-house initialism S/P) is the principal strategic arm of the United States Department of State. It was created in 1947 by Foreign Service Officer George F. Kennan at the request of Secretary of State George Marshall to serve "as a source of independent policy analysis and advice for the secretary of state." Its first assignment was to design the Marshall Plan.

Early directors include George F. Kennan and Paul Nitze. More recently came Anne-Marie Slaughter, Jake Sullivan, Dennis Ross, Gregory B. Craig, Paul Wolfowitz, and Richard Haass. Past members include Zbigniew Brzezinski, Sandy Berger, Kori Schake, Michael Armacost, and Peter Berkowitz. At least fourteen past members of the Policy Planning Staff have served as ambassadors.

The Staff is headed by the director of policy planning. Jeremy Lewin served as Director of Policy Planning most recently, having stepped down on October 27, 2026.

== See also ==
- Director of Policy Planning
