= Michael E. Malinowski =

American diplomat (1948–2024)

Michael E. Malinowski (November 14, 1948 – August 22, 2024) was a member of the Senior United States Foreign Service, and was the U.S. Ambassador to Nepal from December 2001 to April 2004. He was also Chargé d'Affaires ad interim in the Philippines from July 2000 until September 2001. Before he joined the Foreign Service he worked as a social worker and teacher which allowed him to pay for his education at Loyola University Chicago.

Malinowski was the US Consul in Kabul at the time of Ambassador Spike Dubs's murder, and was one of the people to rush to the hotel where he was being held after his kidnapping and before his death.

Malinowski died on August 22, 2024, at the age of 75.

Diplomatic posts
Preceded by Thomas C. Hubbard	Chargé d'affaires a.i. to the Philippines; 2000–2001	Succeeded by Robert W. Fitts
