= United States government group chat leaks =

2025 US national security scandal

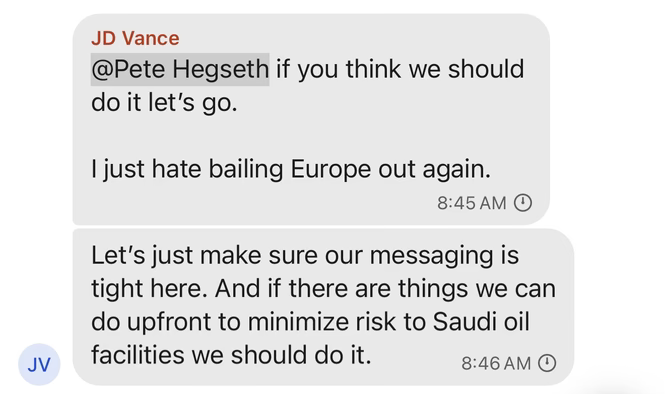
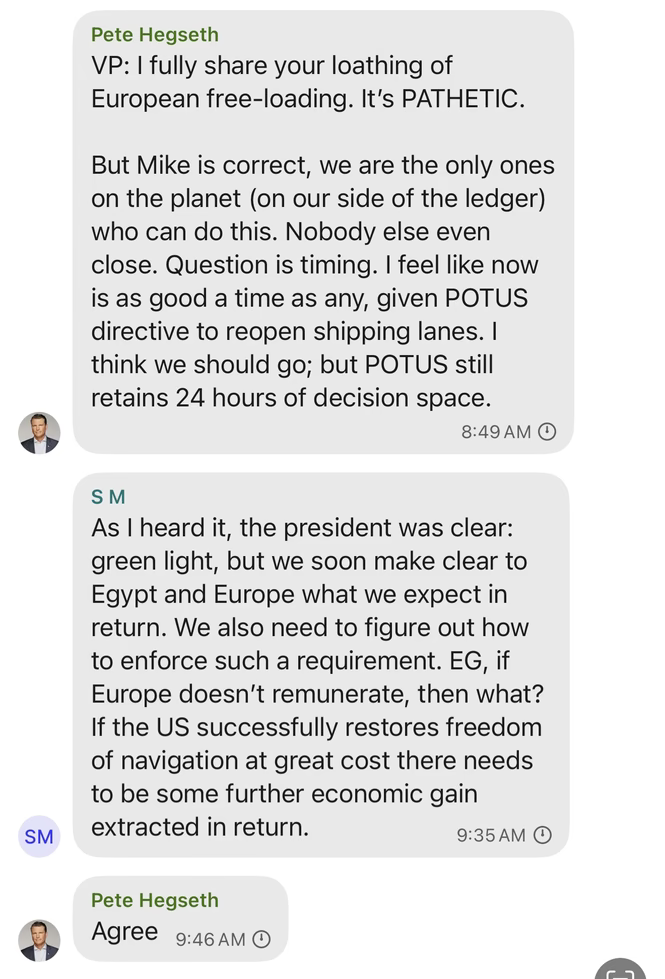
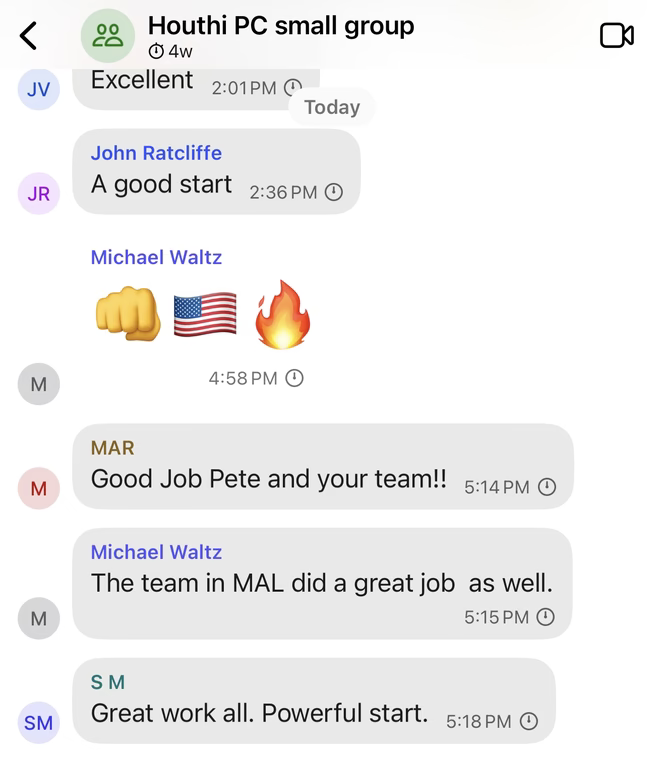
Screenshots from the leaked chat showing US government officials commenting on relations with Europe, protecting Saudi Arabian oil facilities, and the March–May 2025 United States attacks in Yemen

From March 11 to 15, 2025, a group of U.S. national security leaders were observed on a group chat using the Signal messaging service, conversing about imminent military operations against the Houthis in Yemen, code-named Operation Rough Rider. Among the chat's members were Vice President JD Vance, top White House staff, three Cabinet secretaries, and the directors of two Intelligence Community agencies. A high-profile leak occurred after U.S. National Security Advisor Mike Waltz inadvertently added Jeffrey Goldberg, the editor-in-chief of the The Atlantic magazine and moderator of the PBS weekly news program Washington Week, to the group.

On March 15, Secretary of Defense Pete Hegseth used the chat to share sensitive and classified details of the impending airstrikes, including types of aircraft and missiles, as well as launch and attack times. The name of an active undercover CIA officer was mentioned by CIA director John Ratcliffe in the chat, while Vance and Hegseth expressed contempt for European allies.

The contents of the chat became public on March 24, when Goldberg published a partially redacted transcript in The Atlantic. The White House's National Security Council spokesman Brian Hughes verified the chat's authenticity. After other Trump administration officials disputed Goldberg's characterization of the redacted sections as likely containing classified information, The Atlantic published the entire transcript on March 25, to confirm the veracity of his assertion. The incident raised concerns about national security leaders' information security practices, as well as what other sensitive information they may have revealed, whether they were following records-preservation laws, accountability in the Trump administration, and other issues. The ensuing political scandal was dubbed "Signalgate" in the news media. (Note: Attributed to multiple sources:)

A forensic investigation undertaken by the White House's information technology office determined that Waltz had inadvertently saved Goldberg's phone number under Hughes' contact information. Waltz then added Goldberg to the chat while trying to add Hughes. Subsequently, investigative journalists reported that Waltz's team regularly created group chats to coordinate official work, and that Hegseth had shared details about missile strikes in Yemen to a second group chat which included his wife Jennifer, his brother, and his lawyer.

== Background ==
=== United States attacks in Yemen ===
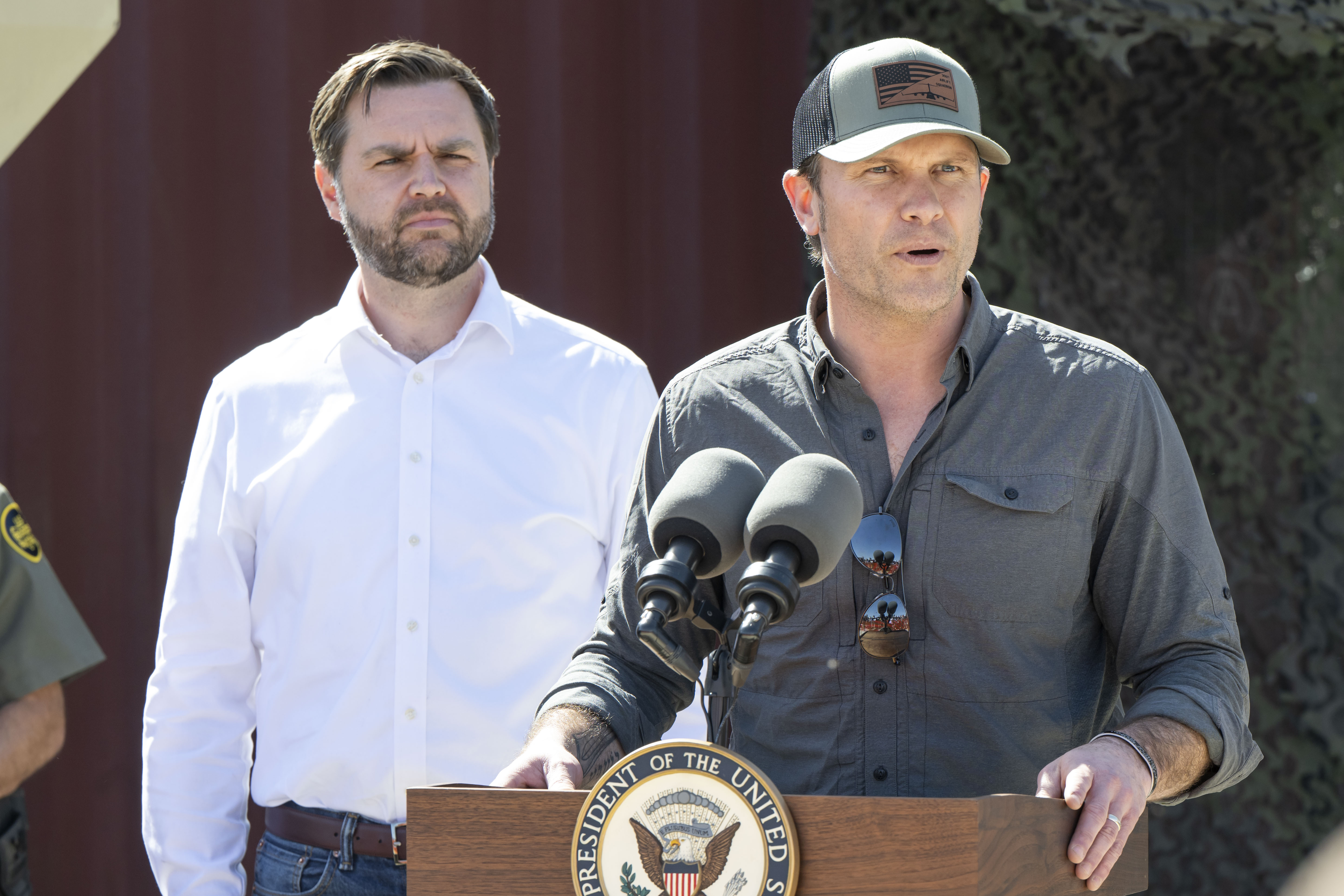
JD Vance and Pete Hegseth, two of the high-ranking officials of the second Trump administration who were in the group chat

Due to the Gaza war, the Houthi administration in Yemen began launching attacks on Israel and against international shipping in the Red Sea, including the bombing, hijacking and destruction of commercial vessels. In January 2024, the United States and United Kingdom began a series of airstrikes on the Houthis in retaliation.

After assuming office in January 2025, the Trump administration claimed it would implement a more assertive response to Houthi disruptions of international shipping lanes than the preceding Biden administration had undertaken. Following the implementation of the January 2025 Gaza war ceasefire on January 19, the Houthis announced that they would stop attacking ships transiting through the Red Sea, except for ships affiliated with Israel. After Israel blocked humanitarian aid from entering Gaza, the Houthis resumed their attacks on March 11. On March 15, the United States launched another series of airstrikes on Yemen. These attacks were part of a campaign dubbed Operation Rough Rider by Secretary of Defense Pete Hegseth, alluding to President Theodore Roosevelt's Rough Riders in the Spanish–American War.

=== Signal messaging app ===
Signal, the software at the center of the leak

Signal, a mobile messaging app, gained popularity among the general public, particularly after the 2024 Chinese telecommunications breach; the app offers features such as end-to-end encryption for all messages and voice calls by default, minimal data collection, and optional auto-deletion of messages. The US government discourages the use of Signal for official business because of records-retention laws and the app's security features possibly not working if the user's device is compromised.

On March 18, 2025, the Pentagon sent a department-wide memo warning, "Please note: third party messaging apps (e.g. Signal) are permitted by policy for unclassified accountability/recall exercises but are NOT approved to process or store nonpublic unclassified information"—a category whose release would be far less potentially damaging than that about ongoing military operations. A former NSA hacker said that linking Signal to a desktop app is one of its biggest risks, as Ratcliffe suggested he had done.

=== Past comments by Trump administration members ===
Certain Trump administration members involved in the Signal group chat had previously criticized Hillary Clinton for her email controversy: Donald Trump in 2016 said that Clinton tried to "bypass government security" and "sent and received classified information on an insecure server, putting the safety of the American people under threat"; Pete Hegseth in 2016 said that America's allies would be "worried that our leaders may be exposing them because of their gross negligence or their recklessness in handling information", Stephen Miller in 2022 said that "foreign adversaries could easily hack classified ops & intel in real time" due to Clinton's use of "unsecured" communications; while Mike Waltz claimed Clinton was able to "delete 33,000 government emails on a private server".

Other Trump administration members involved in the Signal group chat had also previously emphasized the need to strictly punish security breaches; Tulsi Gabbard on March 14, 2025, said: "Any unauthorized release of classified information is a violation of the law and will be treated as such", while John Ratcliffe stated in 2019: "Mishandling classified information is still a violation of the Espionage Act."

== Members ==
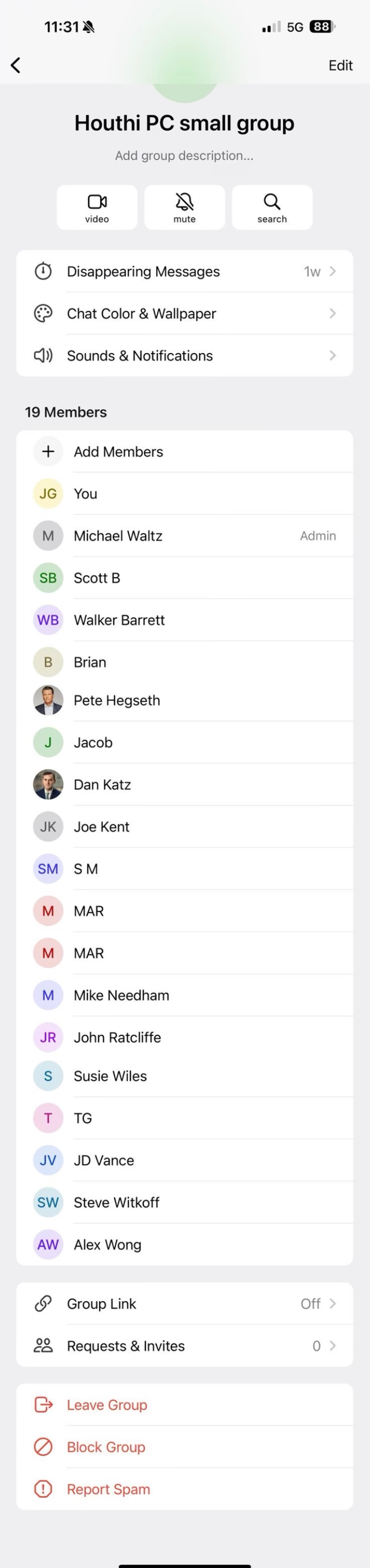
The members of the group chat

The group's 19 members included these people, plus a CIA officer whose name The Atlantic withheld at the CIA's request:

- Alex Wong, Principal Deputy National Security Adviser.
- Brian McCormack, Chief of Staff for the National Security Council.
- Dan Katz, Chief of Staff for the Secretary of the Treasury.
- Jacob Reses, Chief of Staff to the Vice President of the United States.
- JD Vance, Vice President.
- Jeffrey Goldberg, editor-in-chief of The Atlantic.
- Joe Kent, Acting Chief of Staff for the Director of National Intelligence, and nominee for National Counterterrorism Center Director.
- John Ratcliffe, Director of the Central Intelligence Agency.
- Marco Rubio, Secretary of State.
- Mike Needham, Special Adviser and Consultant on Foreign Policy Issues for the Department of State.
- Mike Waltz, National Security Advisor.
- Pete Hegseth, Secretary of Defense.
- Scott Bessent, Secretary of the Treasury.
- Stephen Miller, White House Deputy Chief of Staff for Policy.
- Steve Witkoff, United States Special Envoy to the Middle East.
- Susie Wiles, White House Chief of Staff.
- Tulsi Gabbard, Director of National Intelligence.
- Walker Barrett, professional staff member for the House Armed Services Committee Republicans.

== Leak ==
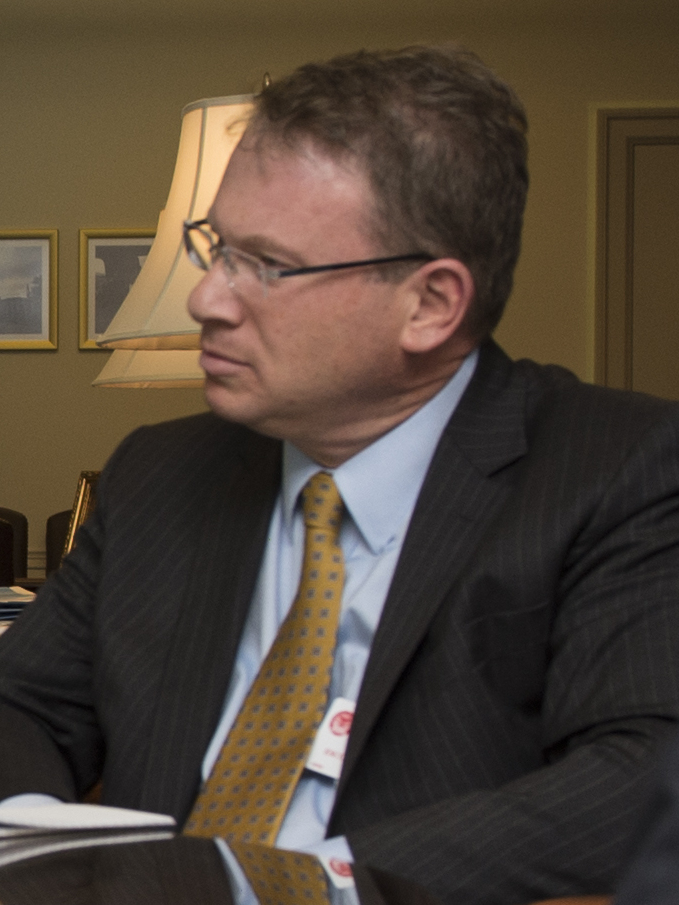
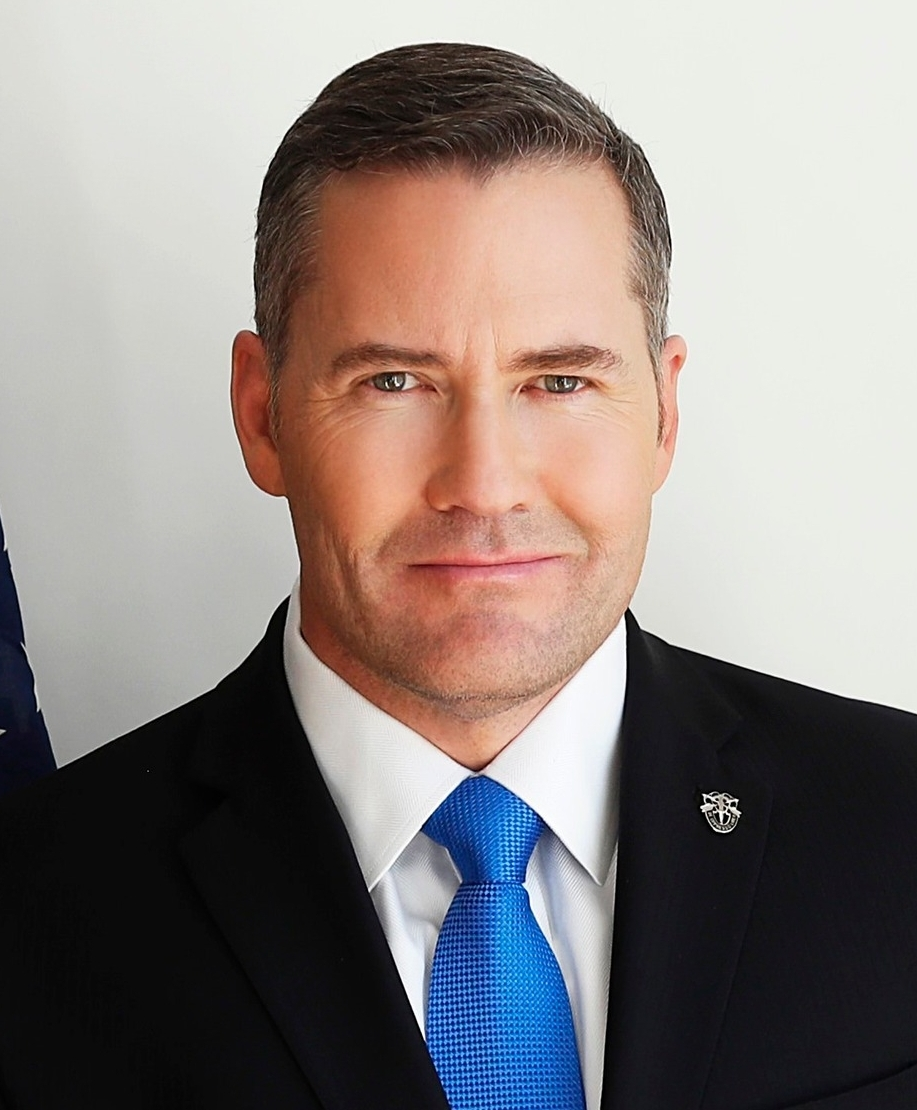
Editor-in-chief of The Atlantic, Jeffrey Goldberg (left) was mistakenly added to the group chat by National Security Advisor Michael Waltz (right).

On March 11, 2025, National Security Advisor Michael Waltz established a group conversation on Signal that included several high-ranking administration officials, including Vice President JD Vance, Secretary of State Marco Rubio, Secretary of Defense Pete Hegseth, CIA director John Ratcliffe, Director of National Intelligence Tulsi Gabbard (identified as "TG"), Secretary of the Treasury Scott Bessent (identified as "Scott B"), presumed deputy White House chief of staff Stephen Miller (identified as "S M"), White House Chief of Staff Susie Wiles, and United States special envoy to the Middle East Steve Witkoff.

As he created the chat, Waltz also sent a Signal request to Jeffrey Goldberg, the editor-in-chief of The Atlantic magazine, to join the conversation. On March 13, 2025, Waltz added Goldberg to a private Signal group chat labeled "Houthi PC small group". Although his presence in the chat was visible to other members under the handle "JG", the other members were apparently unaware of his identity.

The group initially exchanged messages about staffing arrangements, with principals designating representatives from their departments for coordination purposes. In the subsequent discussion, the officials shared sensitive operational details regarding the planned military strikes in Yemen, including specific information about targets, weapons, and strike sequencing. (Note: Signal users do not see the phone number of the participants by default. Users also have the option to allow calls by a unique user ID only.)

On March 13, Witkoff was in Moscow meeting with Russian leader and President Vladimir Putin, though it is not known whether he had a device with Signal with him at the time. Just after midnight Moscow time, the chat named an active CIA intelligence officer; according to a Telegram post by Sergei Markov, Witkoff and Putin were in a meeting until 1:30 a.m.

On March 14, discussion in the group turned to prospective military action against Houthi targets. Witkoff had left Russia and was in Baku, Azerbaijan. The account identified as Vance expressed reservations about the operation's timing and alignment with administration messaging, suggesting a delay of one month. This account stated:

I am not sure the president is aware how inconsistent this is with his message on Europe right now. There's a further risk that we see a moderate to severe spike in oil prices. I am willing to support the consensus of the team and keep these concerns to myself. But there is a strong argument for delaying this a month, doing the messaging work on why this matters, seeing where the economy is, etc.

The Hegseth-associated account responded with a rationale for immediate action, pointing to risks of delaying, including potential leaks that might make the administration appear indecisive. The group discussion included exchanges about European economic interests in Red Sea shipping lanes and the administration's policy regarding cost-sharing with allies, with the Vance-associated account stating "I just hate bailing Europe out again." while the Hegseth-associated account responded: "VP: I fully share your loathing of European free-loading. It's PATHETIC. But Mike is correct, we are the only ones on the planet (on our side of the ledger) who can do this." An account presumed to be Stephen Miller's effectively ended the discussion by stating that the president had given a "green light", but wanted assurances that European nations would contribute financially to securing shipping lanes.

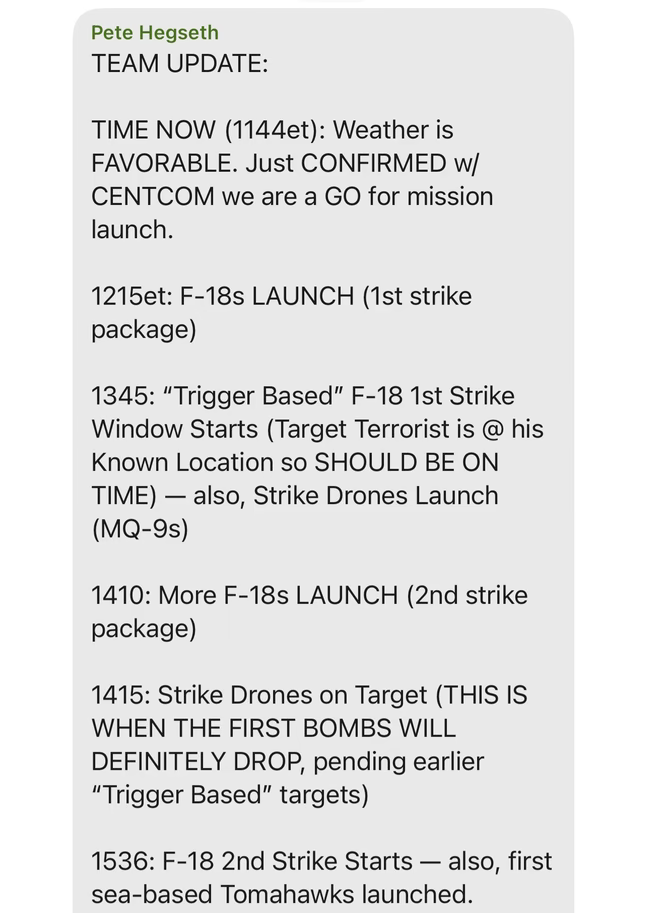

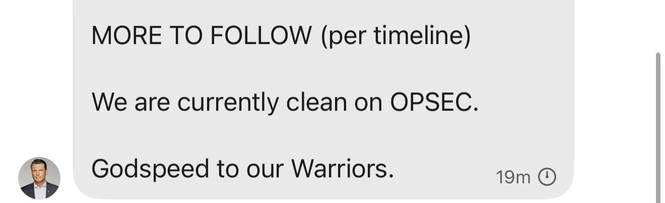
Screenshots from the leaked chat showing Pete Hegseth discussing classified plans for the attacks in Yemen

On March 15 at 11:44 a.m. EDT (UTC−4), the Hegseth-associated account shared what Goldberg described as detailed operational information regarding imminent strikes, including target information, weapons systems to be employed and attack sequencing. Goldberg stated that this message indicated strikes were to begin about 1:45 p.m. EDT. When most of the chat was published by The Atlantic, it showed that Hegseth revealed information including the launch times of F-18 aircraft, MQ-9 drones and Tomahawk missiles, as well as the time when the F-18 aircraft would reach their targets, and the time when the bombs would land.

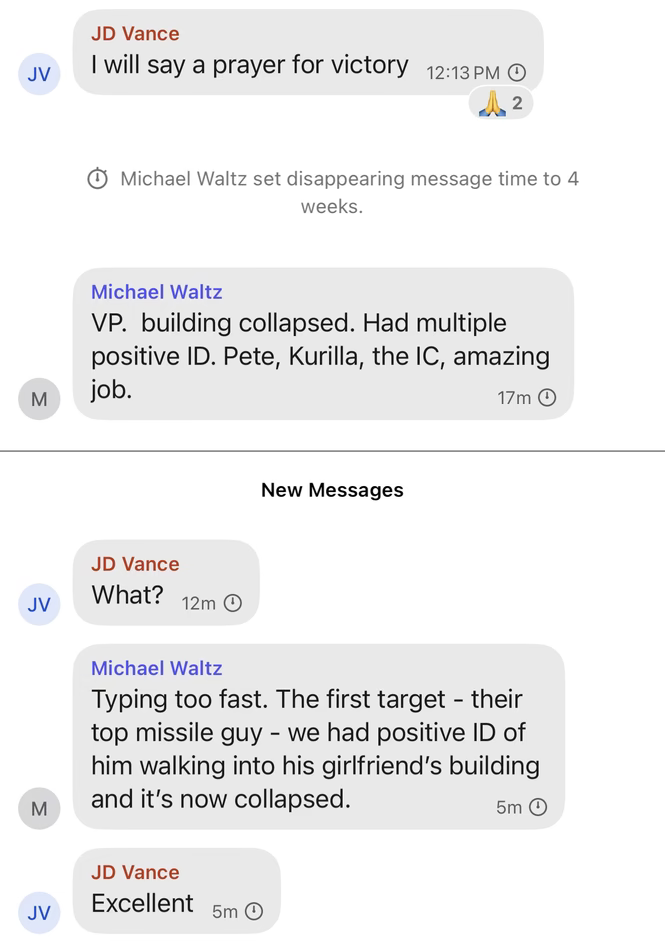
A screenshot from the leaked chat showing Waltz updating Vance on the result of the attacks in Yemen

About 1:55 p.m. EDT on March 15, Goldberg verified through social media reports that explosions were occurring in Sanaa, Yemen's capital. After the strikes, group members exchanged congratulatory messages. The Waltz-associated account characterized the military operation as an "amazing job", while other accounts contributed affirmative responses. The Waltz-associated account shared three emojis in response: a fist, an American flag, and a fire symbol. A user identified as "MAR", believed to be Rubio, congratulated "Pete and your team!!" referencing Defense Secretary Pete Hegseth. The Witkoff-associated account sent a message with five emojis: two praying hands, a flexed bicep and two American flags.

Goldberg observed the conversation without participating and eventually removed himself from the chat, which would have automatically notified the group members as of the time he left. He received no inquiries about his participation or departure.

=== First Atlantic article ===
On March 24, 2025, Goldberg published an article about the group chat and its security breach in The Atlantic. He expressed the concern of security experts that the coordination of national security operations over Signal potentially violated the Espionage Act. Signal is not an approved government platform for sharing classified information. The experts also raised concern at the group chat's potential violations of federal records laws requiring preservation of communications regarding official government business: the Signal group was reportedly configured by Waltz to delete its messages after one week or four weeks. The inclusion of a journalist in the group potentially constituted an illegal disclosure of sensitive information to an individual without proper clearance.

=== Congressional hearings ===
On March 25, an annual hearing on the intelligence community's worldwide threat assessment was held by the Senate Select Committee on Intelligence, and top intelligence officers were questioned about the leak. Republican senators Mike Rounds (South Dakota) and Todd Young (Indiana) also said they would ask questions about the leak in the classified section of the hearing. On March 26, the House Permanent Select Committee on Intelligence held a hearing in the same context, and they discussed the leak as well.

=== Second Atlantic article ===
In response to the Trump administration's claims that no classified material was shared in the Signal group, Goldberg and Shane Harris published a second article in The Atlantic on March 26. This article contained the full text of the exchanges that took place during the March 15 attack on the Houthis, omitting only the name of a CIA operative. This revealed that the exchange included specific timing of planned military strikes and real-time reports on their deployment.

== White House internal investigation ==
Following the leak, the Pentagon launched an internal investigation on April 3, 2025, after a request from the United States Senate Committee on Armed Services.

According to The Guardian, a "forensic review" by the White House information technology office discovered Goldberg had emailed the campaign in October 2024 regarding a story critical of Trump's attitude toward wounded service members. The campaign forwarded the email to Trump's then-spokesperson Brian Hughes, who copied and pasted the entirety of the email into a text message that he sent to Waltz. The content included a signature block with Goldberg's phone number.

Waltz did not call Goldberg but saved Goldberg's number in his iPhone under the contact card for Hughes. The Guardian reported, "According to the White House, the number was erroneously saved during a 'contact suggestion update' by Waltz's iPhone", in which an algorithm suggests adding unknown numbers to existing contacts that it detects may be related.

Following the election, Hughes became the spokesperson for the United States National Security Council. Waltz's error went undiscovered until Waltz attempted to add Hughes to the "Houthi PC small group" group chat and inadvertently added Goldberg instead.

== Additional Signal group chats ==
On March 30, 2025, The Wall Street Journal reported that Waltz had hosted Signal group chats with Cabinet members on a number of topics, including Somalia and the Russian invasion of Ukraine. On April 2, 2025, Dasha Burns, writing for Politico, reported Waltz's team "regularly set up chats on Signal to coordinate official work on issues including Ukraine, China, Gaza, Middle East policy, Africa and Europe". Burns's four sources were either included in the group chats or had direct knowledge of them. All four reported seeing "sensitive details of national security work", but could not confirm their classification.

On April 20, 2025, The New York Times reported that Secretary of Defense Pete Hegseth initiated another Signal group chat titled "Defense | Team Huddle". This chat reportedly had information about the timing of airstrikes, and included Hegseth's brother, his wife and about a dozen other people. Officials speaking for the Pentagon stated that the informants were trying to sabotage Hegseth's agenda, and that "there was no classified information in any Signal chat".

Former Pentagon official Evelyn Farkas opined that participants apparently "broke the law" in mishandling military secrets. Some media outlets reported, based on anonymous sources, that the White House was considering firing Hegseth.

=== Other security errors ===
On March 26, 2025, the German magazine Der Spiegel reported that they were able to find private contact details and passwords for members of the group chat, including Gabbard, Hegseth, and Waltz, on the Internet. They did not publish this information, but informed the affected officials and the US Defense Department of their findings. The same day, Wired reported that Waltz's Venmo account was open to the public and that it was connected to hundreds of other people, including Susie Wiles and National Security Council staffer Walker Barrett. Security experts told Wired that knowledge of these connections could be exploited by foreign actors. The account was made private after this reporting. The Wall Street Journal then uncovered that Hegseth had brought his wife to two meetings with foreign military counterparts, even though attendees are typically limited to those with security clearances because of the sensitive information discussed. On April 1, 2025, The Washington Post reported that members of the National Security Council, including Waltz, have conducted government business over personal Gmail accounts, which is unencrypted. They also reported that Waltz would copy and paste his schedule into Signal to coordinate meetings and discussions.

On May 2, 2025, it was revealed in photographs of Waltz taken during a cabinet meeting that he was using an unofficial Signal-compatible app (available for iOS and Android) called TM SGNL made by Israeli company TeleMessage. Drop Site News raised concerns over the potential for Israeli espionage given the IDF backgrounds of many key TeleMessage employees. 404 Media reported that a hacker was able to penetrate the TeleMessage server in "fifteen to twenty minutes", revealing DHS phone numbers and emails, and allowing capture of in-flight messages.

On August 14, 2025, 404 Media reported that the Immigrations and Customs Enforcement agency (ICE) had added a random user to an unencrypted Multimedia Messaging Service (MMS) group chat titled "Mass Text". The chat contained sensitive information about an individual "seemingly marked for deportation," including their criminal history, Social Security number, and driver's license number.

== Aftermath ==
=== American Oversight v. Hegseth, et al ===
On March 26, a government watchdog group, American Oversight, filed suit in the District Court for the District of Columbia against Pete Hegseth, Tulsi Gabbard, John Ratcliffe, Scott Bessent, Marco Rubio, and the National Archives and Records Administration, alleging that they failed to abide by the Federal Records Act and the Administrative Procedure Act. The case was assigned to judge James Boasberg. The next day, the judge issued a temporary restraining order, telling the government to preserve all Signal communications from March 11–15 and to file a status report the next Monday with declarations specifying what steps were taken to preserve the messages.

Boasberg is also presiding over another Trump administration case, J.G.G. v. Trump, involving use of the Alien Enemies Act to deport Venezuelan nationals who are alleged to be members of the criminal gang Tren de Aragua. Journalist Colin Kalmbacher noted that in that case, the administration told Boasberg that it would not provide him with information about the commercial flights used to take the Venezuelans to a prison in El Salvador, claiming a state secrets privilege, while in this case, the administration has publicly insisted that no classified national security information was divulged.

=== Investigation into unauthorized disclosures ===
On March 21, Hegseth's chief of staff, Joseph "Joe" R. Kasper, signed a memo that requested an investigation into "recent unauthorized disclosures of national security information involving sensitive communications", adding "the use of polygraphs in the execution of this investigation will be in accordance with applicable law and policy." The leaks under investigation included military operational plans for the Panama Canal, a second carrier headed to the Red Sea, Elon Musk's unusual visit to the Pentagon, and the pausing of the collection of intelligence to Ukraine. (Note: Even though the Trump administration confirmed that Musk had no official role at the Department of Government Efficiency (DOGE), Musk had worked (Note: Trump had repeatedly stated that Musk was "in charge" of DOGE, although the administration had stated that he was neither an official nor an employee in the organization, nor authorized to make government decisions. On March 18, 2025, the United States District Court for the District of Maryland determined that Elon Musk was "the leader of DOGE" and was exercising the authority of its lawful administrator on a de facto basis.) in support of DOGE and had been present for several of President Trump's Cabinet meetings. On March 21, 2025, after the Kasper memo was signed, both the Pentagon and the White House vehemently denied reports that Elon Musk visited the Pentagon to receive a briefing on war plans in the event of a war with China.)

On April 15, 2025, Darin Selnick, who was the Pentagon's deputy chief of staff, was suspended, and Dan Caldwell, senior adviser to Hegseth, was escorted from the Pentagon. Hegseth had noted Caldwell as the best staff point of contact for the National Security Council as it prepared for the launch of strikes against the Houthis in Yemen. Both Defense Department officials' administrative leaves occurred amid allegations of leaking sensitive and classified materials. It is unknown if any polygraph tests had been administered.

According to a later report from The Guardian, Justin Fulcher, a former Pentagon lead for the US DOGE Service Temporary Organization who Hegseth had recently appointed as a senior adviser, falsely claimed to know of an illegal NSA wiretap implicating Selnick, Caldwell and the deputy secretary's chief of staff Colin Carroll in the leaks. These claims reportedly contributed to the aides' firings. Fulcher denied the account. In March 2025, Forbes magazine found that Fulcher had apparently overstated his national security and business accomplishments.

=== Inspector general probe ===
In the aftermath of the Signal group chat leak, there were calls for an expedited inspector general review of the incident. On March 27, 2025, Senate Armed Services Committee chair Sen. Roger Wicker (R-MS) and ranking chairman Sen. Jack Reed (D-RI) submitted a joint request to the Trump administration for an expedited IG assessment of whether or not Pete Hegseth and other DoD officials adhered to Pentagon policies, procedures, and classification requirements. In response to the request, on April 3, acting Pentagon inspector general Steven A. Stebbins announced in a notification letter to Hegseth that he was probing his usage of Signal in the group chat.

The investigation has led to turmoil within the Defense Department, raising tensions and the firings and resignations of several top DoD officials, including former Chief of Staff Joe Kasper. On May 1, as news of the incident broke, the Pentagon inspector general expanded his investigation to include a second Signal group chat made by Hegseth that included members of his family.

On December 3, the Inspector General submitted the classified version of its final report to Congress and released an unclassified version to the public the next day. While the Inspector General noted that Hegseth has the authority to declassify information and did not assess whether the information included in the chat was classified or was declassified properly, the investigation found that Hegseth's use of a personal device for official business violated department policy, that the information included in the chat originated from a document that was marked as classified at the time, and that Hegseth's use of Signal unnecessarily risked endangering military personnel and Operation Rough Rider itself. The report noted that Hegseth refused to be interviewed in-person, only provided written responses, and did not provide his personal device to be examined.

=== Departure of Mike Waltz and Alex Wong ===
On May 1, 2025, it was revealed that both national security adviser Mike Waltz and his deputy Alex Wong would be leaving their posts in the National Security Council, with Marco Rubio serving as interim national security advisor. It was announced soon after that Trump intended to nominate Waltz for U.N. ambassador.

== Reactions ==
=== Donald Trump ===
Two hours after the article was released, as Trump was at a public event with Louisiana Governor Jeff Landry, he was asked about the leak; he said he was not aware of it. The next day, March 25, he expressed confidence in Waltz, telling NBC News that it "was one of Michael [Waltz]'s people on the phone. A staffer had his number on there".

Trump has dismissed questions about firing those responsible for the incident, saying that the administration has "looked into it" and that it is "something that can happen". Initially, Trump said he did not know anything about Signal, later adding that it "was the best technology for the moment". Trump was critical of The Atlantic and called Goldberg a "sleezebag" who found the chat "very boring and he left early". He later criticized US District Judge James Boasberg, calling him "disgraceful" and accused him of "massive" Trump derangement syndrome, among other things. The judge had been assigned to oversee the case involving the chats, which Trump claimed was "statistically impossible". Trump later said that Pete Hegseth was "doing a great job", describing the political scandal and ensuing controversy as a "witch hunt" against Hegseth and added that Waltz has taken responsibility for it.

Trump said he believed Goldberg should have granted him more credit for The Atlantic's growth in subscribers after the incident, according to an April 2026 article in which Goldberg reflected on Signalgate's aftermath.

The Atlantic reported that Trump is privately upset with the recklessness of his advisers but has focused on attacking the press and journalists in public.

=== Trump administration ===
When The Atlantic published its report on March 24, 2025, National Security Council spokesperson Brian Hughes issued a statement confirming the message chain was authentic and indicating that they were "reviewing how an inadvertent number was added to the chain". Hughes characterized the thread as demonstration of "deep and thoughtful policy coordination between senior officials" and said there had been "no threats to troops or national security" resulting from the incident.

On March 24, White House Press Secretary Karoline Leavitt stated that President Trump maintained "utmost confidence in his national security team, including National Security Advisor Mike Waltz". She suggested that reporters should trust Hegseth over Goldberg, whom she said was "a registered Democrat and an anti-Trump sensationalist reporter". On March 26, Karoline Leavitt said that Elon Musk had volunteered his "technical experts" to help the White House investigate how Goldberg was added to the chat. Regarding the incident, Director of National Intelligence Tulsi Gabbard said no classified information was shared.

According to anonymous sources within the administration, the incident caused internal concern, with multiple administration officials expressing shock at the security breach. Other officials said that Signal was widely used throughout the administration for communications, leading to internal discussions about implementing new guidance or rules for internal communications. There were no immediate indications that Trump planned to dismiss any officials over the matter.

==== Members of the chat ====
External videos
- "Defense Secretary Hegseth Speaks to Reporters", March 24, 2025, C-SPAN

After landing at Joint Base Pearl Harbor–Hickam in Hawaii, Hegseth said that war plans had not been discussed in the text messages. Vance's communications director William Martin issued a statement: "Vice President Vance unequivocally supports this administration's foreign policy" and that "The President and the Vice President have had subsequent conversations about this matter and are in complete agreement." CIA director John Ratcliffe said Signal was authorized for the group chat.

On March 25, at a White House event with US ambassadorial nominees, Waltz said he had never interacted with Goldberg: "This one in particular, I've never met, don't know, never communicated with." Waltz added that he "wouldn't know him if I bumped into him or saw him in a police lineup" and called Goldberg "the bottom scum of journalists". Photos on social media of Waltz and Goldberg standing next to each other during a 2021 event at the French Embassy circulated after Waltz's claim. Goldberg said of the photos, "If your eyeballs see us together, then I guess your eyeballs are seeing us together".

Waltz said in an interview with Laura Ingraham that he took "full responsibility" for the inclusion of Goldberg in the group chat, but later in the interview criticized The Atlantic's coverage and its reporting on the Gold Star military families (Note: Waltz's mention of Jeffrey Goldberg lying about Gold Star families may come from a 2024 article of his containing these paragraphs about former White House chief of staff John F. Kelly: "What can I add that has not already been said?" Kelly asked. "A person that thinks those who defend their country in uniform, or are shot down or seriously wounded in combat, or spend years being tortured as POWs, are all 'suckers' because 'there is nothing in it for them.' A person that did not want to be seen in the presence of military amputees because 'it doesn't look good for me.' A person who demonstrated open contempt for a Gold Star family—for all Gold Star families—on TV during the 2016 campaign, and rants that our most precious heroes who gave their lives in America's defense are 'losers' and wouldn't visit their graves in France." When we spoke this week, Kelly told me, "President Trump used the terms suckers and losers to describe soldiers who gave their lives in the defense of our country. There are many, many people who have heard him say these things. The visit to France wasn't the first time he said this.") and the Russia "hoax". Trump later commented, "I don't think he should apologize. I think he's doing his best." Trump claimed a Waltz staffer had included Goldberg, which was later contradicted by Waltz on national television.

Waltz has also suggested that Goldberg added himself to the Signal chat or that a technical mishap that led to the breach, claims that were later described by Goldberg as "crazy". Goldberg claims that he received a message request from Waltz on March 11, which he accepted. Goldberg also said in an interview, "If I'm such a nefarious character, why am I in Mike Waltz's phone? Why does he have my phone number? Why is he including me in this chat? And what do you expect a reporter to do when you learn interesting information about the way an administration is contemplating military action? What do they really think is going to happen?".

=== United States Congress ===
==== House of Representatives ====
Republican Speaker of the House of Representatives Mike Johnson said on March 24, "I think it would be a terrible mistake for there to be adverse consequences on any of the people that were involved in that call. They were trying to do a good job, the mission was accomplished with precision. I think that's what matters in the end." He added, "Apparently an inadvertent phone number made it onto that thread. They're going to track that down and make sure that doesn't happen again." Johnson expressed confidence that the administration would address the issue, stating: "They'll fix it. They'll fix it."

House Minority Leader Hakeem Jeffries (D-New York) called for a congressional hearing into the incident, saying it was important to learn what happened and to keep "this type of national security breach from ever happening again". Jeffries said the administration's handling of sensitive information was "reckless, irresponsible and dangerous". He said the leak was evidence that Trump, who promised to "hire only the very best", had instead set up an administration "filled with lackeys and incompetent cronies".

Representative Jim Himes (D-Connecticut), the ranking member on the House Intelligence Committee, expressed strong concern, stating he was "horrified" by reports that senior national security officials shared sensitive information via an encrypted but still commercial messaging application. He characterized the actions as "a brazen violation of laws and regulations that exist to protect national security".

House Foreign Affairs Committee ranking member Gregory Meeks (D-New York) demanded that committee chair Brian Mast (R-Florida) hold a congressional hearing, and called the leak "the most astonishing breach of our national security in recent history".

Representative Don Bacon (R-Nebraska), a former Air Force brigadier general and member of the House Armed Services Committee, rejected and criticized White House efforts to downplay the incident and said "The White House is in denial that this was not classified or sensitive data, they should just own up to it and preserve credibility." He also said on CNN, "I will guarantee you, 99.99 percent with confidence, Russia and China are monitoring those two phones, so I just think it's a security violation, and there's no doubt that Russia and China saw this stuff within hours of the actual attacks on Yemen or the Houthis." Bacon further called the group chat a "gross error" and said, "They intentionally put highly classified information on an unclassified device, I would have lost my security clearance in the Air Force for this and for a lot less." Following the April 20 reporting of an additional Signal chat, Bacon suggested "I wouldn't tolerate it if I was in charge" and that Hegseth is "acting like he's above the law—and that shows an amateur person". Politico reported this as Bacon calling for Hegseth's firing.

==== Senate ====
Senate Minority Leader Chuck Schumer (D-New York) characterized the incident as "one of the most stunning breaches of military intelligence" in recent history during a floor speech on March 24. Schumer urged his Republican colleagues to collaborate in a congressional hearing into the security breach, describing the situation as extraordinarily serious and requiring immediate attention. Schumer later introduced a bill, Operational Security (OPSEC) Act of 2025, to establish an office for training administration officials in security protocols.

Senate Majority Leader John Thune (R-South Dakota) stated that he would investigate the matter in detail. Senator John Cornyn (R-Texas) offered a more critical assessment, describing it as a "huge screw up" and suggesting that "the Interagency would look at that", referring to the fact that the group chat involved heads of multiple government agencies.

Senator Jack Reed (D-Rhode Island), the ranking member on the Senate Armed Services Committee, issued a statement calling the incident "one of the most egregious failures of operational security and common sense" he had witnessed during his career. He indicated his intention to seek immediate answers from the administration regarding the security lapse. Senator Roger Wicker (R-Mississippi), Chairman of the Senate Armed Services Committee, took a more measured approach but acknowledged the gravity of the situation. Speaking to reporters, Wicker confirmed that the committee was "very concerned" about the incident and planned to "look into it on a bipartisan basis". This represented one of the stronger responses from Republican leadership, as most GOP lawmakers explicitly avoided calling for investigations or hearings.

Senator Tammy Duckworth (D-Illinois), an Iraq War veteran, characterized Hegseth as "the most unqualified Secretary of Defense in history" and accused him of "demonstrating his incompetence by literally leaking classified war plans in the group chat". She further asserted that "Hegseth and Trump are making our country less safe" through their handling of sensitive information.

Senator Elizabeth Warren (D-Massachusetts) strongly condemned the incident, describing it on social media as "blatantly illegal and dangerous beyond belief". She characterized the administration officials as "complete amateurs" on handling national security matters and questioned what other sensitive discussions might be occurring in similar unclassified settings, asking: "What other highly sensitive national security conversations are happening over group chat? Any other random people accidentally added to those, too?"

Senator Lisa Murkowski (R-Alaska) stated: "Think about what we would do if Biden were president and this came out... we would raise the roof." She added that "It's going to be interesting to see if anybody loses their job over this".

Senator Mazie Hirono (D-Hawaii) described the incident as "egregious, reckless, and illegal".

Senator Josh Hawley (R-Missouri), in an interview with Laura Ingraham, spoke against "leftist media", stating, "They can't argue with the policies, which the American people support, they can't argue with this new demonstration of American strength that is keeping Americans safe at home and abroad, so now we're griping about who's on a text message and who's not."

Senator Mark Kelly (D-Arizona), in an interview with NPR, called for Pete Hegseth's resignation, stating that he is "unqualified for this job;" and "if he doesn't resign, the president should fire him."

=== Other political figures ===
Former CIA Director and Defense Secretary Leon Panetta commented that "somebody needs to get fired" and highlighted that if someone other than Goldberg had received the information, they "could reveal this information immediately to the Houthis in Yemen that they were about to be attacked".

Former Secretary of State and 2016 Democratic presidential nominee Hillary Clinton responded to the news with a brief statement on social media platform X (formerly Twitter): "You have got to be kidding me." This comment gained particular attention given previous scrutiny over Clinton's own handling of sensitive information during her tenure as Secretary of State, including an FBI investigation into her use of a private email server for official communications instead of official State Department email accounts maintained on federal servers.

Pete Buttigieg, a former Naval Intelligence officer who served as Transportation Secretary during the Biden administration, characterized the incident from "an operational security perspective" as "the highest level of fuckup imaginable" and concluded that "[t]hese people cannot keep America safe".

John Bolton, who served as National Security Advisor during Trump's first term, described the administration's use of Signal in any sense as "stunning".

Alex Wagner, a former assistant Air Force secretary for manpower and reserve affairs, wrote that "if any Airman or Guardian or civilian employee were discovered to have shared top-secret information on their personal devices, it would be the end of their career and likely would result in a court-martial or criminal referral to the Justice Department. To fail to hold, say, Defense Secretary Pete Hegseth accountable would be to undermine the military's crucial dedication to operational security and to send the corrosive message that leaders are held to a lower standard than their troops".

=== US military personnel ===
A dozen Air Force and Navy fighter pilots told The New York Times that they were concerned with the leaders' poor operational security and inability to admit their errors.

=== International ===
European representatives reacted negatively to the leaked group chat, with various anonymous officials voicing concern for the "reckless" leaks and badmouthing of European nations as "freeloaders". European officials nonetheless assured the public that their diplomatic relations with the United States remained stable and that the lives of their people were not at risk. Canadian prime minister Mark Carney, in the context of his country's deteriorating relations with the United States, warned that the leaks meant that Canada has to start looking out more for itself in defense capabilities. Israeli officials were reported to be "furious" with the leak because it included sensitive intelligence Israel provided to the United States.

== See also ==
- 2020 United States federal government data breach
- 2022–2023 Pentagon document leaks – Leak of American classified intelligence
- 2023 Consumer Financial Protection Bureau data breach – Abusive transfer of confidential information
- Donald Trump's disclosures of classified information
- Hillary Clinton email controversy – American political incident
- Joe Biden classified documents incident – 2022–2024 political incident
- List of -gate scandals and controversies – Scandals with the suffix -gate
- Őszöd speech – 2006 speech by Hungarian Prime Minister Ferenc Gyurcsány
- United States diplomatic cables leak – 2010–2011 release of 251,287 diplomatic cables
- Watergate scandal – 1970s political scandal in the U.S.
