= FaceTime (disambiguation) =

FaceTime, Facetime or Face time may refer to:

- FaceTime, an Apple product
- Face time, social interaction
- FaceTime Communications, the former name of Actiance
- FaceTime (song), a 21 Savage song from Issa Album
- Facetime (Ari Lennox song)
