= Ivy Global School =

- Florida, United States

Information
- Type: Online K–12 school
- Established: 2019
- Accreditation: Cognia

Ivy Global School (IGS) is an American online K–12 school established in 2019 in Florida, United States.

== History ==
Ivy Global School was established in 2019 in the state of Florida, United States, in response to the growing demand among international students for access to U.S.-based education. The development of online education, together with the trend toward personalized learning pathways and early study-abroad planning, created favorable conditions for Ivy Global School to develop a U.S. K–12 school model that allows students to follow an American curriculum through a flexible learning approach without geographical limitations.

From its inception, Ivy Global School has focused on implementing educational programs aligned with U.S. state and national standards for students from elementary through high school levels. Over time, the school has expanded its academic offerings, developed its online learning system, and built a teaching staff that meets U.S. instructional standards. In parallel, Ivy Global School has established academic partnerships with educational organizations such as Florida Virtual School (FLVS), Edmentum, as well as specialized academies in the fields of sports and healthcare, in order to diversify academic content and support different student pathways.

In 2023, Ivy Global School officially launched its campus in the United States, marking a milestone in the expansion of its educational model from fully online delivery to a blended approach that includes on-site learning. The operation of the U.S. campus enhances student learning experiences, supports academic activities, and provides students with more comprehensive exposure to the American educational environment.

== Educational model ==
Ivy Global School applies a student-centered educational model, delivering programs aligned with U.S. state and national standards through a flexible learning format. The curriculum is designed to ensure continuity across grade levels while addressing the diverse learning needs of students in an international educational context.

In terms of academic orientation, Ivy Global School follows a college-preparatory and international pathway model, developing structured learning pathways from elementary through high school within the U.S. education system. This approach focuses on building academic foundations, learning skills, and academic transfer readiness for students as they progress to higher levels of education within the U.S. system or equivalent international systems.

Ivy Global School serves students from elementary to high school levels (K–12), primarily international students seeking to pursue a U.S.-based education through online or blended learning formats. Students come from various countries and regions, particularly across Asia, and typically follow long-term educational pathways aligned with the U.S. education system.

== Programs ==
=== U.S. Elementary & Middle School (Grades K–8) ===
The U.S. Elementary and Middle School Program at Ivy Global School is developed in alignment with U.S. state and national standards and serves students from Kindergarten through Grade 8. The curriculum focuses on core subjects such as Mathematics, English Language Arts, Science, and Social Studies, providing students with essential knowledge and academic skills for subsequent levels of study.

The program is delivered through a flexible learning format tailored to students' age and academic ability. At this stage, the school emphasizes the development of effective study habits, academic English proficiency, and foundational thinking skills in preparation for high school.

=== Honor Program (Grades 3–8) ===
The Honor Program at Ivy Global School is designed for students in Grades 3–8 who demonstrate advanced academic ability or wish to pursue an accelerated learning pathway. The curriculum is structured to extend and deepen learning beyond the standard program, supporting the development of analytical thinking, problem-solving abilities, and higher-level academic skills.

This program enables students to access advanced coursework while building a strong academic foundation for high school and more specialized academic programs in later stages.

=== American High School Diploma (Grades 9–12) ===
The American High School Diploma Program at Ivy Global School is a U.S. secondary education program serving students in Grades 9–12. Students earn credits in accordance with program requirements and complete required and elective courses based on individualized academic plans.

The program is designed with a college-preparatory orientation, helping students become familiar with academic expectations, assessment methods, and learning environments within the U.S. education system, while supporting their preparation for academic transition and further study in international educational settings.

== Teaching format ==
Ivy Global School operates primarily as an online school, providing a comprehensive K-12 curriculum from elementary to high school. Students attend classes via the internet, allowing for flexibility in time and location, which caters to the demand for personalized educational pathways.

The Learning Management System (LMS) serves as the core platform for all instructional activities. The school utilizes advanced educational technology platforms to manage learning materials, track academic progress, and organize interactive Live-classes, creating a synchronized digital educational ecosystem.

In addition to its purely online model, Ivy Global School implements hybrid learning by establishing training hubs in the United States. This model combines digital self-paced learning with live or online interaction with instructors to optimize comprehension and support the development of students' social skills.

== Admissions ==
Entrance requirements include an academic review based on transcripts from previous school years. For students from non-English speaking countries, the school requires an English language proficiency assessment to ensure they can successfully engage with the American standard curriculum.

The general admission process involves several steps, beginning with online registration. Upon receiving the application, the admissions coordination department conducts interviews or consultations to analyze transcripts and advise on a suitable academic roadmap before a formal admission decision is made.

The student body is diverse, including full-time students who enroll as their primary school, as well as part-time students seeking to earn supplemental credits or experience an international curriculum. The program specifically targets students desiring flexibility, those with special talents requiring a customized schedule, or individuals preparing for study abroad goals. For the 2024–2025 academic year, the school welcomed nearly 1,000 students from 11 countries.

== Accreditation ==
Ivy Global School has earned comprehensive educational accreditation from Cognia, one of the largest accrediting bodies in the United States. This process involved meeting 34 rigorous standards regarding leadership capacity, learning capacity, and resource capacity, validating the school's international training quality.

Diplomas and transcripts issued by the school hold legal validity within the U.S. education system and are recognized by international educational organizations. This ensures academic transparency, allowing students' results to be recognized for credit transfers between secondary schools or for university admission procedures.

The potential for transfer and study abroad is a significant advantage, supported by recognition from prestigious accrediting bodies and approval from the NCAA (National Collegiate Athletic Association) for the high school program. Graduates are eligible to apply to universities in the United States and other countries worldwide.

== Staff and organization ==
The organizational structure consists of an executive board responsible for development strategy and an Academic Board managing professional quality. The Academic Board oversees the implementation of the curriculum, ensuring content aligns with U.S. state and national standards, such as the Common Core.

The faculty comprises educational experts with professional degrees and U.S. teaching certifications. Teachers provide direct instruction, grade assignments, and support students during interactive sessions, ensuring pedagogical integrity and quality delivery in a digital environment.

Supporting the teaching staff are homeroom teachers and academic advisors located in local regions. This team acts as a bridge between the school, students, and parents, closely monitoring academic progress and providing timely psychological and academic guidance.

Furthermore, Ivy Global School features a team of specialists and college counselors for U.S. university admissions. As IGS students, they receive support in selecting suitable universities and majors, as well as guidance on completing application procedures.

== Activities and partnerships ==
Ivy Global School has established an extensive network of academic partners with world-renowned educational providers such as Florida Virtual School (FLVS), Edmentum, and Jallah Academy (Canada). Students can easily transfer to international schools, pursue secondary education abroad, and gain advantages when applying for U.S. scholarships, particularly at partner institutions such as Keiser University Vietnam, SaiGon Business School, Broward College, Montverde Academy, Fork Union Military Academy, Chaminade High School, and New Mexico Military Academy.

In Vietnam, Ivy Global School establishes "IGS Hubs" through partnerships with major educational systems like Alpha School (Hanoi and Hai Phong), Lincoln School, and Martin Academy (Quang Nam - Da Nang). These collaborations focus on implementing the Vietnam-U.S. Dual Diploma pathway. The school also commits to supporting partners through the transfer of educational technology, academic materials, and teacher training according to Florida state standards. The school has also partnered with Webster University Tashkent to expand U.S.-standard learning opportunities.

In the field of talent development, Ivy Global School has signed strategic partnerships with international sports academies, including Els Performance Golf Academy (EPGA), AFRIYEA Golf Academy (Uganda), International Junior Golf Academy (IJGA), and Junior Player Golf Academy (JPGA). These agreements aim to provide flexible, personalized learning pathways that allow student-athletes to balance professional training intensity with completing a standard U.S. high school program.

The extracurricular program is designed to develop individual potential across various fields, featuring competitions such as IGS Start-up, IGS's Got Talent, Dubbing Contest, and IGS Talent Search. Nearly 600 students competed in the IGS Talent Search 2024 scholarship competition. For exceptionally gifted students, the school accompanies them in international arenas like the World Scholar's Cup, Junior Golf Championships, and various comprehensive athletic games, meeting the admission standards of prestigious global universities.

== Feedback and reception ==
Interaction between parents, students, and the school is maintained through periodic reporting systems and online meetings. Parents can directly monitor student progress via the management system, enhancing coordination between the family and the school in educational management.

The school also maintains public feedback channels and periodic quality surveys as required by accrediting organizations. Receiving and addressing feedback is part of the continuous improvement commitment that the school upholds to maintain its Cognia accreditation status.

== See also ==
- Online education
- Advanced Placement
- International education
