= Roger Simon (journalist) =

American journalist (1948–2026)

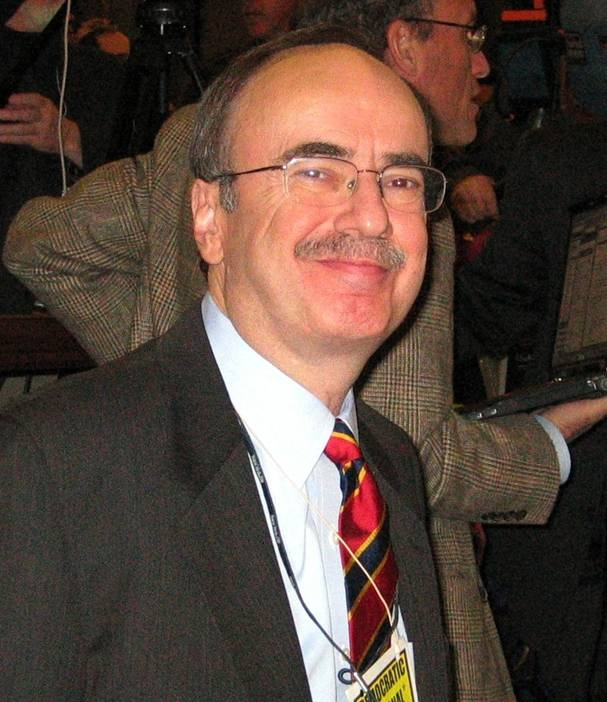
- Born: Roger Mitchell Simon; March 29, 1948; Chicago, Illinois, U.S.
- Died: September 10, 2026 (aged 78); Washington, D.C., U.S.
- Education: University of Illinois Urbana-Champaign
- Occupations: Writer, journalist, author
- Writing career
- Genres: Journalism, politics, non-fiction

Roger Mitchell Simon (March 29, 1948 – September 10, 2026) was an American writer and commentator, the chief political columnist of Politico and a New York Times best-selling author. He won more than three dozen first-place awards for journalism, and is the only person to win twice the American Society of Newspaper Editors Distinguished Writing Award for commentary. His book on the 1996 presidential race, Show Time, became a New York Times best-seller.

== Early life and career ==
Simon was born in Chicago, Illinois, on March 29, 1948. He received a bachelor's degree in English from the University of Illinois Urbana-Champaign in 1970. After college, Simon was a reporter or columnist for several newspapers, including the Waukegan, Illinois, News-Sun, the Baltimore Sun, and the Chicago Sun-Times.

In 1998, he became the White House correspondent of the Chicago Tribune and covered the Monica Lewinsky scandal. In 1999, he joined U.S. News & World Report as its chief political correspondent and then political editor. He joined Bloomberg News in January 2006 as its first chief political correspondent, and later joined Politico as its first chief political columnist.

His columns included dateline reporting on apartheid in South Africa; the Israeli invasion of Lebanon; the U.S. invasion of Grenada; the trial of serial killer John Wayne Gacy, with whom he obtained an exclusive interview; and the criminal trial of O.J. Simpson. Simon's columns on spousal abuse earned him awards from women's groups and a change of policy from the Chicago Police Department making such abuse a crime rather than a “domestic disturbance.”

Based in Washington, D.C., Simon contributed articles to national magazines and newspapers, and appeared as a panelist or political analyst on numerous television and radio programs. Simon's syndicated columns were distributed by Creators Syndicate to newspapers throughout the world.

He announced his retirement in early 2017. On February 1, 2017, Simon published his last column in Politico. A few weeks later he became a columnist for the Chicago Sun-Times.

== Personal life and death ==
Simon was married to Marcia Kramer, a free-lance editor and former copy desk chief of the Washington Post. He died from pneumonia in Washington, D.C., on September 10, 2026, at the age of 78.

== Accolades ==
Michael Kinsley once wrote that Simon's writing “balances just about halfway between Hunter Thompson and Theodore White.”

In April 1999, Simon was inducted into the Chicago Journalism Hall of Fame. Simon was a Poynter Media Fellow at Yale University, a Hoover Media Fellow at Stanford University, and a Kennedy School of Government Institute of Politics Fellow at Harvard University. In 2014 Simon became a fellow at the University of Chicago Institute of Politics.

In 2015 Simon won the Dateline Award of the Society of Professional Journalists Washington, D.C. Professional Chapter for Best Column. He was cited for his "thought-provoking writing, storytelling, and interviewing skills" for six columns that included an "extremely prescient analysis of the rioting in Ferguson, Missouri.”

In April 2013 Simon won first place in the National Headliner Awards for a series of columns he wrote during the 2012 U.S. presidential campaign on the politics of gun control. The Headliner Awards program is one of the oldest and largest annual contests recognizing journalistic merit in the communications industry. Simon won the award six times.

In July 2013, Simon was awarded first place by the National Press Club in winning the Angele Gingras Humor Award. Judges said: "Simon's writing is witty, specific and based on sharp observations of politics and the media."

In July 2011 Simon was nominated for an Online Journalism Award in the Commentary / Blogging, Large Site division of the contest.

== Bibliography ==
External videos
- Booknotes interview with Simon on Show Time: The American Political Circus and the Race for the White House, February 1, 1998, C-SPAN

Simon was also a speaker and author. Books written by Simon include:

- Simon Says: The Best of Roger Simon (1986)
- Road Show: In America, Anyone Can Become President, It's One of the Risks We Take (1990; covers the 1988 presidential campaign)
- Show Time: The American Political Circus and the Race for the White House (1998; covers the 1996 presidential campaign)
- Divided We Stand: How Al Gore Beat George Bush and Lost the Presidency (2002; covers the 2000 presidential campaign)
- Reckoning: Campaign 2012 and the Battle for the Soul of America (2013; covers the 2012 presidential election)
