= University of Chicago Institute of Politics =

Nonpartisan extracurricular program at the University of Chicago

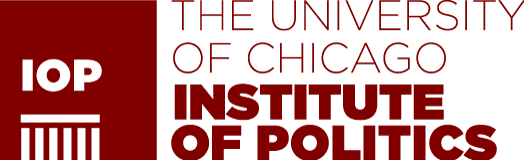
- Established: 2013; 13 years ago
- Location: Chicago, Illinois, U.S.
- Coordinates: 41.791160°N 87.596110°W
- Interactive map of University of Chicago; Institute of Politics
- Website: politics.uchicago.edu

The Institute of Politics (IOP) is a nonpartisan extracurricular program associated with the College of the University of Chicago and the Harris School of Public Policy. It was initiated in 2013 to inspire students to pursue careers in politics and public service.

== History and structure ==
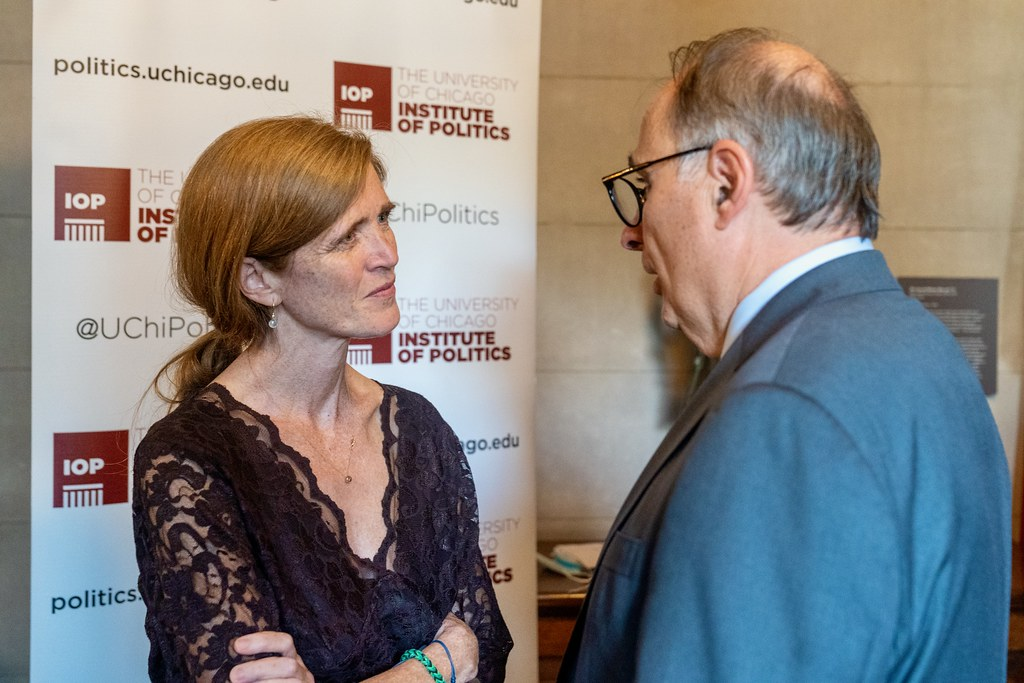
Ambassador Samantha Power meets with students at the IOP

Spearheaded by University of Chicago alumnus David Axelrod after the Barack Obama 2012 presidential campaign, the IOP's programming unofficially began by sponsoring internships with Politico at the Republican National Convention and Democratic National Convention. The IOP officially opened in 2013 and consists of four core programs: Civic Engagement, Speaker Series, Internships and Careers, and Pritzker Fellows.

=== Civic engagement ===
The IOP's civic engagement program focuses on activating student interest in public service through student-led initiatives. The largest of these is UChiVotes, a nonpartisan voter engagement initiative founded to boost voter turnout and engagement on the University of Chicago campus. In 2018, UChiVotes helped register more than 70% of undergraduates to vote. Other student-led programs include the Bridge Writing Workshop, a partnership with Cook County Jail, where students lead creative writing workshops for incarcerated individuals, W+, Leaders of Color, Spectrum, and Tech Team. The IOP also manages The Gate, an independent student-run magazine focused on politics and policy, and "Bridging the Divide," a public service leadership program.

=== Speaker series ===
Another core function of the IOP is a speaker series, in which the institute hosts a plethora of events that connect students with key political figures through live interviews and town halls. Typically, speakers are elected officials, activists, authors, journalists, and other key figures in politics and public service.

Since its inception, the IOP has hosted prominent speakers, including Barack Obama, Joe Biden, Mitt Romney, Rand Paul, Al Gore, Mike Pence, Rick Santorum, John McCain, Newt Gingrich, Bernie Sanders, Elizabeth Warren, Pete Buttigieg, Andrew Yang, Amy Klobuchar, John Brennan, Frank Bruni, Edward Snowden (via videochat), Jon Stewart, Arthur Brooks, Bill Browder, Gina Raimondo, and Chance the Rapper; hosted fellows such as Beth Myers, Michael Steele, Roger Simon, Husain Haqqani, Matthew Dowd, Howard Wolfson, Mark Udall, Tom Harkin, Michael Morell, Jeff Roe, Reihan Salam, and Bakari Sellers.

=== Internships and careers ===
The institute works with the university's Office of Career Advancement to provide internships, fellowships, and career opportunities to students. It has arranged over 250 student internships at institutions like the U.S. Capitol, the Brookings Institution, and the White House and placed over 300 students in civic engagement projects.

=== Pritzker fellows ===
Each quarter, the IOP invites a cohort of political figures for an academic term to serve on campus and investigate political issues with the institute. These Pritzker Fellows offer weekly seminars, office hours, and mentorship to current students to share lessons from their careers. The Fall 2025 Pritzker Fellows are Dan Caldwell, Yangyang Cheng, Mary Peltola, David Pressman, Alex Wagner, and Vince Warren. Former Pritzker Fellows have included former presidential cabinet members Pete Buttigieg and Shalanda Young, former US Senator Doug Jones, former US Representatives Luis Gutiérrez and Mary Peltola, journalists Stephen F. Hayes and Rana Ayyub, and national security officials Ken Cuccinelli and Alex Wagner.

=== Board of advisors ===
The following individuals make up the board of advisors of the Institute of Politics:

- David Axelrod (chairman)
- Stephanie Cutter
- Bob Dold
- Ed Gillespie
- Larry Grisolano
- Sofia Haft
- Heidi Heitkamp
- Bill Kristol
- Ray LaHood
- Isaac Lee
- David Muir
- Shailagh Murray
- Mike Murphy
- Beth Myers
- Bakari Sellers
- Darren Reisberg
- Deval Patrick
- Bret Stephens
- Karen Tumulty
- Amy Walter
- Howard Wolfson

== See also ==
- University of Chicago people
