= Brian McCormack =

Brian McCormack may refer to:

- Brian McCormack (Gaelic footballer) (fl. 1990s–2020s), Irish footballer
- Brian McCormack (lobbyist) (fl. 2010s–2020s), American government official, lobbyist, and political consultant

== See also ==
- Bryan McCormack (born 1972), artist
