= Faith Christian Academy (West Virginia) =

Private school in West Virginia, US

Coordinates: 39.4598°N 77.8959°W

Location
- Elementary: 138 Greensburg Rd; Secondary: 395 Blue & Gold Boulevard; Martinsburg, West Virginia 25404; United States

Information
- Type: Private, Christian (non-denominational)
- Motto: Training Students…Transforming Lives
- Religious affiliation: Christian
- Established: 1983
- Founder: Faith Assembly of God (initially)
- Principal: (Current principal not publicly detailed; see school website for updates)
- Grades: Pre-kindergarten – 12
- Gender: Coeducational
- Enrollment: Approximately 290–425 (varies by source and year)
- Campus: Two campuses
- Colors: Blue and gold (Falcons)
- Mascot: Falcon
- Accreditation: Cognia (formerly NCA CASI); Association of Christian Schools International (ACSI); State of West Virginia
- Website: www.faithchristianacademy.net

Faith Christian Academy is a private, non-denominational Christian school located in Martinsburg, West Virginia. It serves students in pre-kindergarten through twelfth grade and emphasizes a Christ-centered, college-preparatory education with a Biblical worldview.

== History ==
Faith Christian Academy was established in 1983 by Faith Assembly of God in Martinsburg, West Virginia, building on the earlier Melodyland Nursery School founded in 1976. The school opened with 49 students and five faculty members.

It has since grown into an independent, inter-denominational institution representing over 50 different churches and serving families from West Virginia, Maryland, and Virginia.

The school achieved accreditation from the Association of Christian Schools International (ACSI) in 1997 (initial seven-year term, with subsequent re-accreditations) and is jointly accredited by Cognia (formerly North Central Association Commission on Accreditation and School Improvement) and the State of West Virginia.

== Campuses and facilities ==
FCA operates two campuses in Martinsburg:

- Elementary Campus: 138 Greensburg Rd, Martinsburg, WV 25404
- Secondary Campus: 395 Blue & Gold Boulevard, Martinsburg, WV 25404

== Academics and mission ==
The school's mission is "to serve families by providing a Christ-centered, college preparatory education that equips students to become leaders by instilling a Biblical worldview in the heart and mind of each student."

The curriculum integrates academic instruction with Christian teachings, focusing on spiritual, academic, social, and physical development. It aims to develop students' Godly character, critical thinking, and leadership skills.

== Athletics ==
The school's athletic teams are known as the Falcons, with school colors blue and gold. They compete in various sports, including varsity boys' basketball and track and field (both notable for long-tenured coaching staff).

== Admissions and tuition ==
Admissions are open to families seeking Christian education. Applications for full-time students (PK3–12) are handled online. Tuition and fees vary by grade; details are published annually on the school website.

== See also ==
- List of private schools in West Virginia
- Christian school
