= Worldwide Threat Assessment of the US Intelligence Community =

Annual US Senate committee hearing

The Worldwide Threat Assessment of the US Intelligence Community, originally called the "Annual Threat Assessment" is a hearing of the US Senate Select Intelligence Committee that has occurred each year since 2006, until 2020. Each hearing includes at least one "open" or unclassified session and the release of a document that details the high level unclassified assessments of the US intelligence community for a given year.

The unclassified version of the report of April 9, 2021 was presented April 14, 2021 by the Director of National Intelligence Avril Haines and others at a hearing of the Senate Select Committee on Intelligence.

The most recent unclassified document released by the Director of National Intelligence (DNI) Daniel R. Coats is dated January 29, 2019.

The assessment often analyzes the perspective of the US intelligence community and how it will affect US actions.

The Trump administration, without explanation, postponed the DNI's annual Worldwide Threat Assessment which warns that the U.S. remains unprepared for a global pandemic. The office of the DNI was scheduled to deliver the Assessment to the House Intelligence Committee on February 12, 2020.

On March 25, 2025, the top intelligence officials of Trump's second administration talked to Congress about international criminal gangs, drug cartels, and human smuggling. Republican senators discussed China and fentanyl, while Democrat senators criticized the mistaken leak of attack plans to a journalist.
