= Joe Kasper (political operative) =

Joseph "Joe" R. Kasper is an American Republican political operative and lobbyist. He served as Secretary of War Pete Hegseth's first chief of staff from January to April 2025, leading working-level efforts to purge the Department of high-ranking officials that were not considered sufficiently loyal to the Trump administration's agenda.

== Early life and education ==
Kasper graduated from the University of Connecticut in 2003.

== Career ==
Kasper began his career in Washington, DC working for Rep. Rob Simmons. He then worked for Rep. Duncan L. Hunter and subsequently his son, Duncan D. Hunter, in various leadership roles. In September 2017, Kasper stepped down from his position as chief of staff in Rep. Duncan Hunter's office amidst allegations of campaign finance law violations.

Kasper worked in the first Trump administration in various civilian roles at the Department of Defense and the Department of Homeland Security.

In April 2025, Kasper was reportedly set to leave his role for another position within the Department of Defense, but ultimately resigned from a full-time role the Department. The Pentagon announced that he would continue in a role as a Special Government Employee, a mechanism that allows for part-time, temporary government work without the same ethics requirements to which full-time staff adhere.
