= TeleMessage =

Israeli messaging software company

- Type: Private
- Industry: Software
- Founded: 1999; 27 years ago
- Founder: Guy Levit; Gil Shapira
- Headquarters: Israel
- Key people: Guy Levit; (CEO); Horacio Furman; (Chairman)
- Products: Messaging
- Revenue: $6.1 million (2016) USD
- Owner: Independent (1999–2005); Messaging International plc (2005–24); Smarsh (2024–present)
- Number of employees: 55
- Website: www.telemessage.com

TeleMessage is an Israeli software company based in Petah Tikva, Israel. Founded in 1999 by Guy Levit and Gil Shapira, it provides enterprise messaging, mobile communications archiving and high-volume text messaging services.

TeleMessage suspended their worldwide services in May 2025 due to a significant cybersecurity incident. Hackers claimed to have breached the company's internal systems, which led to Telemessage halting all services to investigate and contain the incident.

== History ==
TeleMessage was founded in 1999 in Tel Aviv, Israel raising more than 10 million dollars in its first 2 series of investment rounds. After being acquired by Messaging International plc in August 2005, it then went public and was traded on the London Stock Exchange AIM section under the Messaging International name.

It received conditional funding of up to US$900,000 for a joint research and development project for "Secure Rich Communication Services Messaging" in 2015. The funding was provided by the Israel-US Binational Industrial Research and Development Foundation.

In 2004, Canadian mobile network operator Rogers Wireless selected TeleMessage SMS to Landline solution, powered by ScanSoft RealSpeak, for its TXT 2 Landline service. American wireless network operator Verizon Wireless started using TeleMessage's SMS service to convert typed text messages into audio messages that play to a recipient's landline phone, launching this service in June 2006. Rogers Communications and the American telco Sprint Nextel were amongst others to launch the mail plugin. In 2013, five years after Comverse launched the TeleMessage PC2Mobile with a Tier-1 European operator, Sprint started selling the TeleMessage offering to allow doctors and clinicians to send HIPAA-compliant texts. Delisted from the British stock exchange and privatized in 2017, it joined the G-Cloud public procurement framework and a financial compliance partner program managed by Verint Systems in the following years.

In 2019, it along with Boku Identity and Deep Labs joined NICE Actimize's X-Sight Marketplace. In February 2020, Proofpoint, a Sunnyvale based enterprise security company partnered with TeleMessage to use their Mobile Archiver service for capturing text, voice and WhatsApp messages. The company is also working with Microsoft in protecting and governing data that is arriving from other Microsoft 365 services.

On February 20, 2024, the firm was acquired by Smarsh. Telemessage's main industry competitor is Symphony Communication.

In May 2025, TeleMessage gained media attention after it was revealed that Mike Waltz, former U.S. National Security Advisor, was using a modified version of open source software Signal called "TM SGNL", created by TeleMessage to archive messages securely. Use predates the 2024 government; a federal contract starting in February 2023 has been found for 'TeleMessage mobile electronic message archiving'. It was later reported that TeleMessage had been hacked, and that chat logs archived by TeleMessage's modified Signal application are not end-to-end encrypted, either in transit to their archival storage location or once at rest.

== Products ==
- Mobile Archiver - addresses mobile phone text and call archiving for compliance, regulatory and eDiscovery response requirements. It reduces risk across a variety of industries, capturing mobile content from BYOD and corporate phones; Enabling the captures and archive of: SMS, MMS, Voice calls, as well as WhatsApp and WeChat chats and calls.
- Secure Enterprise Messaging - enables secure enterprise chat for co-workers by using user-friendly mobile apps and a range of APIs that connect to any operational IT system.
- Mass Messaging - provides tools to deliver multi and omnichannel bulk messaging across: SMS, MMS, Voice calls, Faxes, Email, and Mobile Apps.

== Patents ==
- Mobile station (MS) message selection identification system
- Controller for use with communications systems for converting a voice message to a text message

== Awards ==
- 2020, Best Regtech Solution by Finovate Awards.

== See also ==
- Comparison of instant messaging clients
- Internet privacy
- Secure instant messaging
