= Cognia =

Cloud-based compliance archiving and analytics company

Cognia Cloud
- Company type: Privately held company
- Industry: Regulatory compliance
- Founded: 2007
- Defunct: 2017
- Fate: Acquired
- Successor: Smarsh
- Headquarters: London, United Kingdom
- Area served: Worldwide
- Products: Archiving, Call recording, Compliance
- Website: www.smarsh.com

Cognia Cloud was a British cloud-based compliance archiving and analytics company. It provided recording and regulatory solutions to financial institutions, telecommunications service provider and field services enterprises. It was headquartered in the UK with operations in North America and Asia-Pacific. In 2017, it was acquired by Smarsh.

== History ==
The company was established in 2007 and was acquired by Smarsh in 2017.

== Products and services ==
Its core product offering was the Cognia unified communications archive, which monitored, stores and analyzed multi-channel business interactions across multiple media: mobile voice, text, landline, video, Skype, email and social media.

Cognia worked with telco partners in North America, Asia and Europe and served over 60 banks and financial institutions to meet their regulatory requirements, including US Dodd-Frank and EU MiFID II. Cognia's major customers included Swisscom, Vodafone, BNP Paribas, Santander, Royal Bank of Scotland, AVIVA and Centrica.
