= Alex Wagner (government official) =

American civil servant

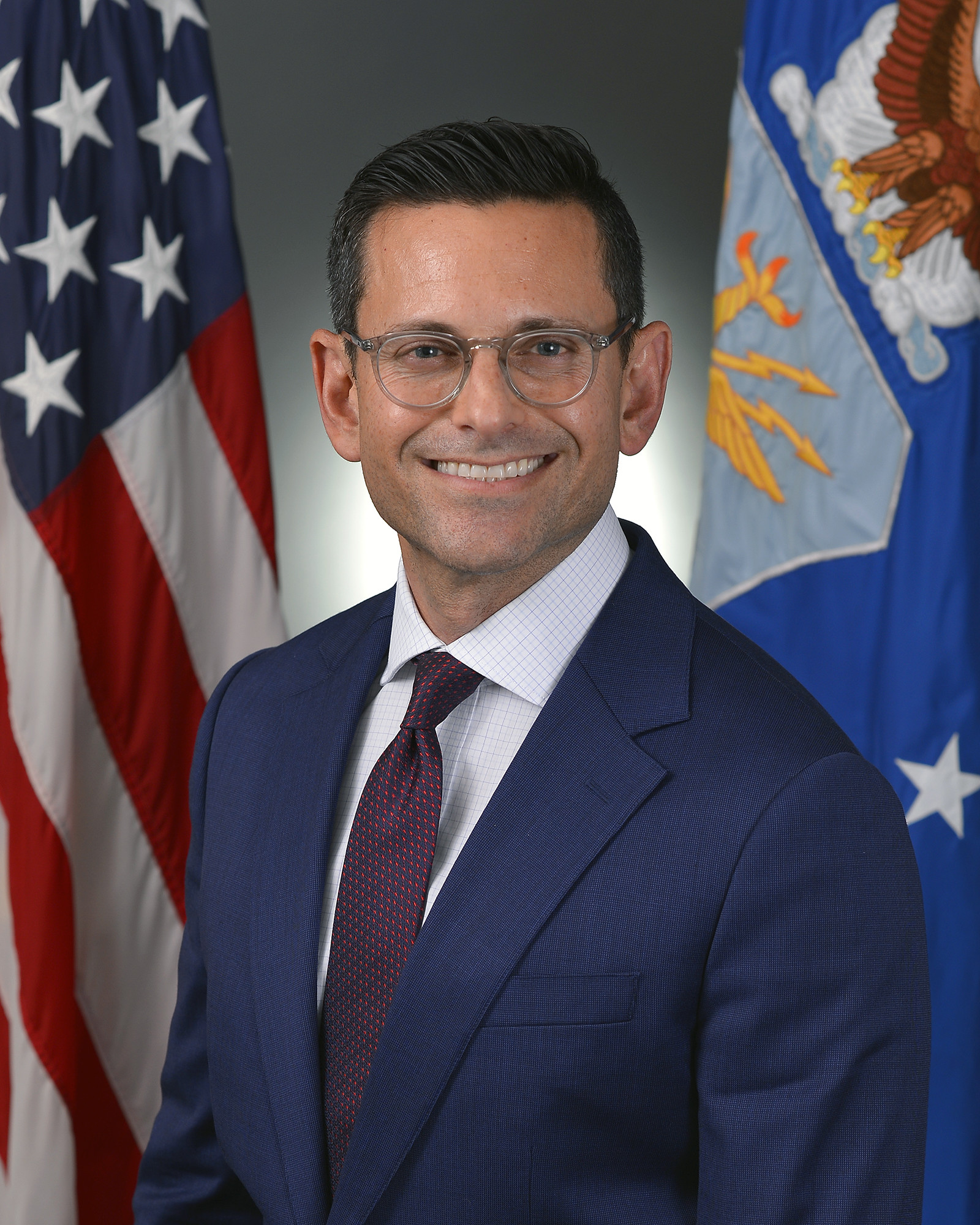
- Official portrait, 2022

Assistant Secretary of the Air Force for Manpower and Reserve Affairs
- In office June 10, 2022 – January 20, 2025
- Preceded by: Shon J. Manasco
- Succeeded by: Richard Anderson

Personal details
- Education: Brown University (BA); Georgetown University (JD)

Alex Wagner is an American lawyer who served as the 12th assistant secretary of the Air Force for manpower and reserve affairs from 2022 to 2025. He previously held roles in the Obama administration, including as chief of staff to Secretary of the Army, from 2015 to 2017, and in the Office of the Secretary of Defense, from 2009 to 2014.

== Early life and education ==
Alex Wagner was born and raised in Southern California. Wagner graduated from Brown University, receiving a B.A. in political science and history in 1999. After Brown, he was an analyst and reporter at the Arms Control Association. In 2005, he earned his Juris Doctor from Georgetown University Law Center and joined the law firm Preston Gates & Ellis now K&L Gates in Seattle.

== Career ==
=== Corporate Law ===
While at Preston Gates, Wagner worked as an intellectual property litigator, focused on cybersecurity and trademark enforcement for a variety of clients, but principally Microsoft Corporation. He also supported the briefing and argument strategy in Washington State Grange v. Washington State Republican Party, 552 U.S. 442 (2008), a Supreme Court case concerning Washington State’s “top-two” primary election system. The system allowed voters to choose any candidate in a primary election, with the top two vote-getters advancing to the general election, regardless of party affiliation. Wagner represented the Washington State Democratic Party and other groups that challenged the system, arguing that it violated their First Amendment right of association by allowing candidates to appear on the ballot with a party label even if they weren’t endorsed by that party.

The U.S Supreme Court, in a 7-2 decision, upheld the system, ruling that it did not, on its face, impose a severe burden on political parties’ associational rights. The Court found that since the ballot did not explicitly indicate party endorsement, it was not inherently unconstitutional.

=== Obama administration ===
Wagner worked on LGBTQ rights policy and outreach during the Barack Obama 2008 presidential campaign. After working on the Obama presidential transition team, Wagner was later appointed to several positions in the Office of the Secretary of Defense focused on nuclear weapons and Nonproliferation policy and later detainee, Human rights, and international humanitarian law policy.

During this time at the Pentagon, he worked closely with other administration appointees, including Tarak Shah, to organize the first Pride event at The Pentagon in 2012.

After briefly leaving the Pentagon for a role on the public policy team at Uber, Wagner rejoined the administration in 2015 as chief of staff to the 22nd Secretary of the Army, Eric Fanning. His work with Fanning involved pushing for innovation in military technology, including the launch of an Army Digital Service that aimed to bring Silicon Valley talent into the military to enhance its technological capabilities. Wagner and Fanning also sought to tell the Army's story better by leveraging new media platforms such as Twitter and Snapchat.

After the Obama administration, Wagner was hired as the vice president of strategic initiatives at the Aerospace Industries Association.

=== Biden administration ===
On July 29, 2021, President of the United States Joe Biden announced his intent to nominate Wagner to be Assistant Secretary of the Air Force (Manpower & Reserve Affairs)—effectively the Chief Human Resource Officer of both the U.S. Air Force and U.S. Space Force. Wagner was confirmed by the Senate on June 7, 2022 and was sworn in on June 10th. In that capacity, he oversaw the entire human capital enterprise of the Department of the Air Force, including leading efforts to ensure the Air Force was able to exceed its 2024 enlisted recruiting goals, without lowering its standards.

After the Biden Administration, Wagner began teaching at Syracuse University's Maxwell School and was appointed as a distinguished fellow at the Atlantic Council. He was selected as a fall 2025 Pritzker Fellow at the University of Chicago Institute of Politics. Wagner has provided remarks on national security and politics featured in MSNBC, ABC News, Newsweek, The Atlantic, and others.

== Personal life ==
Wagner is a member of the LGBTQ community.
