= Federal Records Accountability Act of 2014 =

- Long title: To improve Federal employee compliance with the Federal and Presidential recordkeeping requirements, and for other purposes.
- Announced in: the 113th United States Congress
- Sponsored by: Rep. Mark Meadows (R, NC-11)
- Number of co-sponsors: 1

Codification
- U.S.C. sections affected: 5 U.S.C. § 7552, 5 U.S.C. § 7512, 44 U.S.C. § 2911, 44 U.S.C. § 2208, 44 U.S.C. § 3106, and others.
- Agencies affected: Office of the Vice President of the United States, United States Department of Justice, National Archives and Records Administration, Executive Office of the President, Merit Systems Protection Board, United States Congress

Legislative history
- Introduced in the House as H.R. 5170 by Rep. Mark Meadows (R, NC-11) on July 23, 2014; Committee consideration by United States House Committee on Oversight and Government Reform; Passed the House on September 16, 2014 (voice vote)

The Federal Records Accountability Act of 2014 (H.R. 5170) is a bill that would change the record keeping requirements about some types of communications to ensure that information is not lost. The bill would make it easier to fire a person who willfully and unlawfully concealed, removed, mutilated, obliterated, falsified, or destroyed any record, book, or other thing in the custody of such employee. It would also ban federal employees from using instant messaging for work purposes.

The bill was introduced into the United States House of Representatives during the 113th United States Congress.

== Background ==
The bill was inspired by events such as the loss of Lois Lerner's emails, an important part of the 2013 IRS controversy.

== Provisions of the bill ==
This summary is based largely on the summary provided by the Congressional Research Service, a public domain source.

The Federal Records Accountability Act of 2014 would create a process for the suspension and removal (subject to specified due process requirements) of an employee whom the Inspector General of a federal agency determines has: (1) willfully and unlawfully concealed, removed, mutilated, obliterated, falsified, or destroyed any record, book, or other thing in the custody of such employee; or (2) violated the following disclosure prohibitions.

The bill would prohibit the President, Vice President, or specified staff members or advisers from creating or sending a presidential or vice presidential record using a non-official electronic messaging account unless such individual: (1) includes an official electronic messaging account of the President, Vice President, staff member, or adviser as a recipient in the original creation or transmission of the electronic message and identifies all recipients in such message; and (2) submits the message for appropriate archival storage by the Executive Office of the President.

The bill would prohibit a federal agency official or employee from creating or sending a record using a non-official electronic messaging account unless such officer or employee: (1) includes an official electronic messaging account of the officer or employee as a recipient in the original creation or transmission of the electronic message and identifies all recipients in such message; and (2) submits the message for appropriate archival storage by the agency.

The bill would require a federal agency head: (1) whenever the unlawful concealment, removal, mutilation, obliteration, falsification, or destruction of any record, book, or other thing in the agency's custody comes to his or her attention, to notify the Archivist and publish a general description of the records on the agency's website; and (2) to initiate action through the Attorney General for the recovery of records that have been unlawfully removed from the agency. Requires the Archivist to initiate action to recover such records if the agency head fails to do so within a reasonable period.

The bill would require each agency head to designate a Senior Agency Official for Records Management by November 15, 2014 (and to reaffirm or designate a new such Official by November 15 of each year thereafter), who shall ensure compliance with all applicable records management statutes, regulations, and any guidance issued by the Archivist.

== Procedural history ==
The Federal Records Accountability Act of 2014 was introduced into the United States House of Representatives on July 23, 2014, by Rep. Mark Meadows (R, NC-11). The bill was referred to the United States House Committee on Oversight and Government Reform. On September 16, 2014, the House voted in a voice vote to pass the bill.

== Debate and discussion ==
Rep. Meadows, who introduced the legislation, said that "we know that emails and communications are happening daily that are not getting preserved." Meadows argued that the bill would "put intensified pressure on federal agencies and employees to comply with recordkeeping law."

== See also ==
- Federal Records Act
- Federal Records
- List of bills in the 113th United States Congress
