= Dan Caldwell (defense official) =

American political advisor

Dan Caldwell is an adviser in the Office of the Director of National Intelligence and a former senior adviser to US defense secretary Pete Hegseth.

== Early life and education ==
Caldwell graduated from Arizona State University in 2011. He is a United States Marine Corps veteran, and served in the Iraq War.

== Career ==
From 2011 to 2013, Caldwell worked for U.S. representative David Schweikert.

Caldwell began working for Concerned Veterans for America in 2013. In 2017, Caldwell was named Executive Director of Concerned Veterans for America. Caldwell was also a lobbyist for Americans for Prosperity, an advocacy and lobbying organization backed by Charles Koch.

In February 2025, Caldwell was named Senior Advisor to the US Secretary of Defense. Caldwell was Hegseth’s point person in the Signalgate scandal, in which top Trump administration national security officials, including Hegseth, used the Signal app to discuss plans for a military strike against Houthi militants in Yemen. Caldwell was put on leave following leaks from the Pentagon, and later terminated.

In March 2026, Caldwell was hired by the Office of the Director of National Intelligence where he will serve as an adviser to senior intelligence officials.
