= National Press Club =

National Press Club may refer to:

- Japan National Press Club, Japanese organization
- Jatiya Press Club, Bangladeshi organization
- National Press Club (Australia), organization based in Canberra
- National Press Club (Pakistan), organization based in Islamabad
- National Press Club (United States), organization based in Washington, D.C.
