= Afriyea Golf Academy =

Uganda golf academy

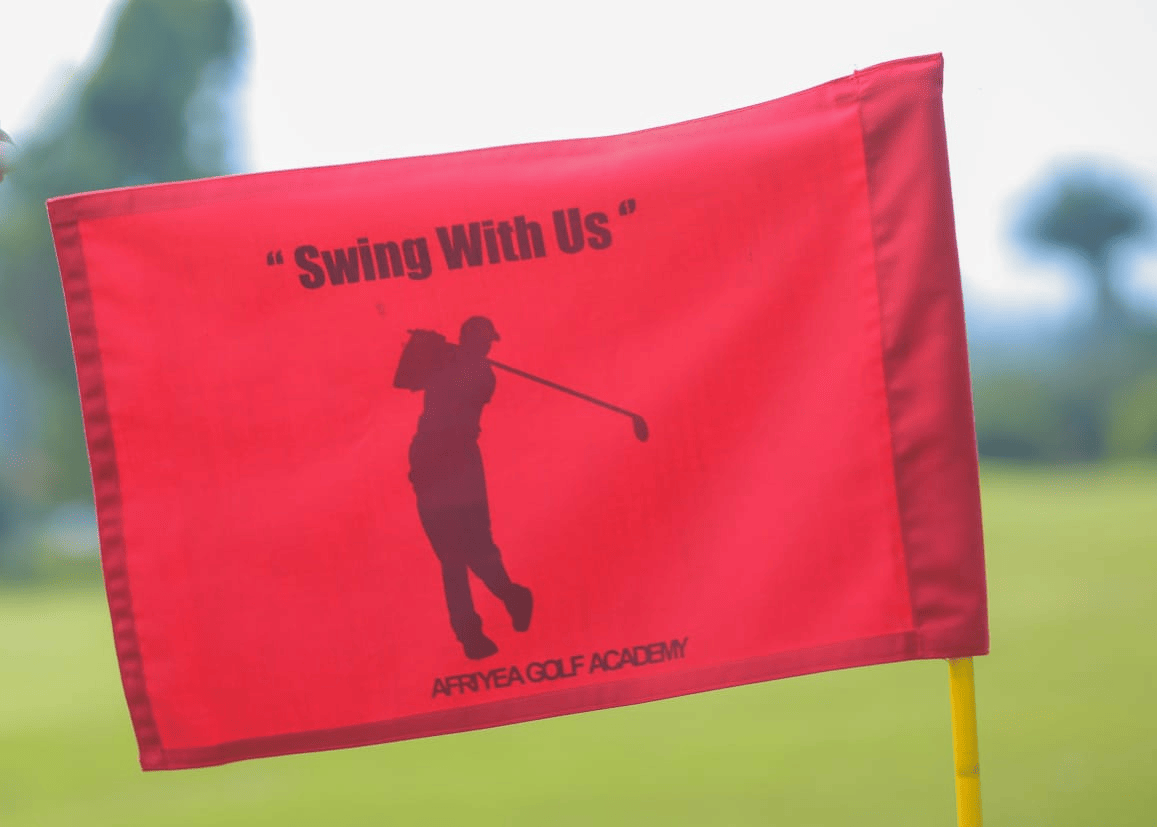
- Afriyea Golf Academy
- Full name: Afriyea Golf Academy
- Founded: August 2020; 6 years ago
- Association: Uganda Golf Union
- Location: Tooro Golf Club, Fort Portal
- Owner: (Uganda) Isaiah Mwesige
- Chairman: Leighton Walker
- Website: www.afriyeagolfacademy.com

The Afriyea Golf Academy is a Ugandan golf academy based in Fort Portal and recognized by the Uganda Golf Club.

== History ==
The Afriyea Golf Academy was established in 2020 by Isaiah Mwesige. The academy comprises over 1000 registered students aged between 4–22 years and operates throughout. The academy has set its model based on the values of hard work, academic excellence, inclusion, sportsmanship, and environmental consciousness, among others. In December 2021, Afriyea hosted their inaugural kids' golf tournament in Fort Portal It has introduced golf to over 1000 children from 21 schools in Uganda and currently has three annexes in Uganda and Tanzania, with plans to expand to more clubs in Africa.

== Location ==
The academy is headquartered at Tooro Golf Club in Fort Portal but also has established training programs in the provincial golf clubs of Uganda and beyond.

== Partnerships ==
The academy is a golf development partner of various golf clubs like Toro Club in Fort Portal, Masindi Golf, and Sports and Morogoro golf club. Internationally, has a partnerships with the 3 Hammers Golf Academy from the United Kingdom, Golf, Center of Gravity Golf Inc. Canada, Golf Industry Guru, and Medi8 Marketing Agency.

== Coaches ==
- Stephen Kasaija
- Adolf Muhumuza
- David Kamulindwa
- Andrew Mugume

== Honors ==
During the Golf Environment Awards in Yorkshire, England in January 2023, Afriyea Golf Academy was awarded a special recognition award.
