= FaceTime =

Apple videotelephony service

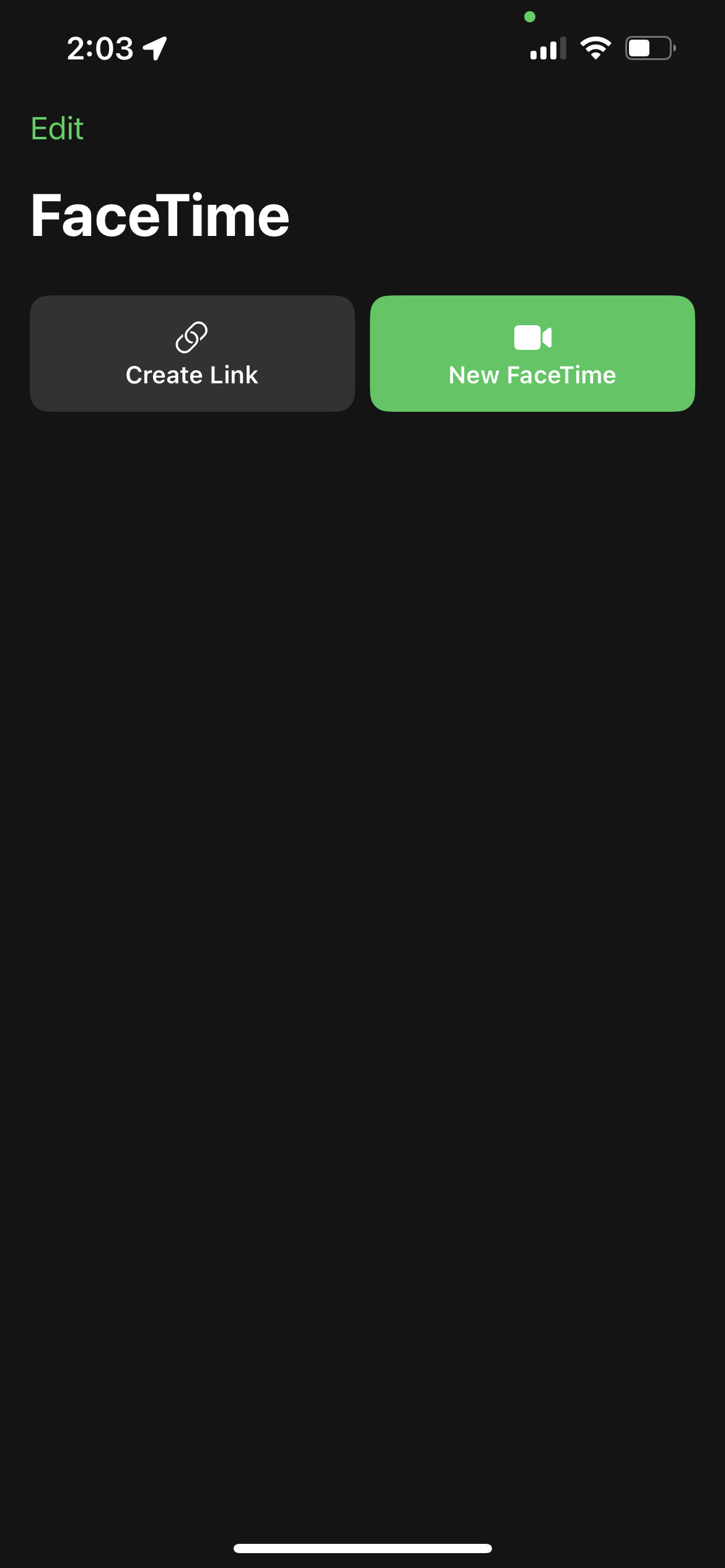
- FaceTime running on an iPhone 13
- Developer: Apple
- Release: iOS: June 24, 2010; 16 years ago (with iOS 4); Mac: February 24, 2011; 15 years ago (with Mac OS X 10.6.6 “Snow Leopard”)
- Operating system: iOS: 4.0 and later; iPadOS; Mac: Mac OS X 10.6.6 and later; tvOS: 17.0 and later; visionOS
- Platform: iPhone; Apple Watch; iPad; iPod Touch; Mac; Apple TV; Apple Vision Pro; Web (participation in ongoing calls, web version not available in China mainland)
- Predecessor: iChat
- Type: Videotelephony, Voice over IP
- License: Proprietary software
- Website: www.facetime.com

FaceTime is a proprietary videotelephony product developed by Apple. FaceTime is available on supported iOS mobile devices running iOS 4 and later and Mac computers that run Mac OS X 10.6.6 and later. FaceTime supports any iOS device with a forward-facing camera and any Mac computer equipped with a FaceTime Camera. FaceTime Audio, an audio-only version, is available on any iOS device that supports iOS 7 or newer, and any Mac with a forward-facing camera running OS X 10.9.2 and later.

FaceTime is included for free in iOS and macOS from Mac OS X Lion (10.7) onwards. Since the release of iOS 15, iPadOS 15, and macOS Monterey, non-Apple systems can be used to participate in FaceTime calls using a web client.

== History ==
Apple acquired the "FaceTime" trademark from FaceTime Communications, which later changed its name to Actiance.

On June 7, 2010, Apple CEO Steve Jobs announced FaceTime alongside the iPhone 4 at the 2010 Worldwide Developers Conference. Initially limited to Wi-Fi video calls between iPhone 4 devices, FaceTime was subsequently added to the fourth-generation iPod Touch and the iPad 2. Apple released a beta version of FaceTime for Mac in October 2010; it left beta and became available through the Mac App Store in February 2011.

iOS 6 added FaceTime calls over cellular data on supported devices in 2012. AT&T initially restricted cellular FaceTime to customers on certain data plans, prompting consumer groups to file a complaint with the Federal Communications Commission alleging that the restriction violated net neutrality rules. iOS 7 introduced FaceTime Audio, an audio-only calling mode, in 2013.

In October 2018, iOS 12 and macOS Mojave added Group FaceTime, enabling audio and video calls with up to 32 participants.

In 2021, iOS 15, iPadOS 15, and macOS Monterey introduced FaceTime links, allowing users of Android and Windows devices to join calls through a web browser. The same software generation introduced SharePlay, which enables participants to share their screens and synchronise supported audio and video content during calls.

FaceTime was added to Apple TV 4K (second generation and later) with tvOS 17 in 2023, using a paired iPhone or iPad as its camera. In 2025, iOS 26 added Live Translation to FaceTime on Apple Intelligence-compatible devices, providing translated live captions during calls.

== Implementation ==
The iPhone's screen when a call is in progress, showing the FaceTime button (grayed out, middle of bottom row)

FaceTime works by establishing a connection between two supported devices. Most Apple devices (including iPhones, iPads, and Macs) introduced after 2011 support FaceTime. FaceTime is currently incompatible with non-Apple devices or any other video calling services. Mac models introduced in 2011 have high-definition video FaceTime, which devices use automatically when both ends have a FaceTime HD camera.

At launch, unlike Mac OS X's iChat, FaceTime did not support group conferencing. The application allowed a one-on-one video chat: only two people could talk at once. If a second user called and the user answered, the video chat with the previous user would end and a new video session began with the second caller. In iPhone, if a phone call was pending and the user attempted to answer, the video call ended and the phone call began with the next user.Support for group video conferencing was previewed with the release of iOS 12, and officially rolled out with iOS 12.1 It allows up to 32 people to participate in a video call simultaneously.

Incoming notifications on iOS devices are shown during a FaceTime call, but if they are opened, the video will be temporarily paused until the user is back in the FaceTime app.

On the iPhone, a user can activate FaceTime during a phone call by pressing the FaceTime button or initiating FaceTime from their call history or the Contacts application. iOS 7 and newer also provide a separate FaceTime app, as there always has been on Apple's non-telephony devices: iPad, iPod Touch, and Mac.

Until the release of iOS 6, FaceTime required a Wi-Fi connection to work. From iOS 6 onwards, FaceTime for the iPhone and iPad has supported FaceTime calls over cellular networks (3G, LTE, or 5G) provided the carrier enables it, as was the case for nearly all carriers worldwide by mid-2013. FaceTime Audio uses about three megabytes of data for every five minutes of conversation; FaceTime Video consumes significantly more. Cellular talk time or minutes are not used after switching from a voice call to a FaceTime call.

FaceTime calls can be placed from supported devices to any phone number or email address that is registered to the FaceTime service. A single email address can be registered to multiple devices, and a call placed to that address rings all devices simultaneously.

== Standards ==
The FaceTime protocol is based on numerous open industry standards but is not interoperable with non-Apple products. FaceTime's lack of interoperability makes customers dependent on Apple and unable to switch away from Apple products.

Upon the launch of the iPhone 4, Jobs stated that Apple would immediately start working with standards bodies to make the FaceTime protocol an "open industry standard". While the protocols are open standards, Apple's FaceTime service requires a client-side certificate.

FaceTime calls are protected by end-to-end encryption so that only the sender and receiver can access them. Apple cannot decrypt this data.

Standards used include:

- H.264 and AAC-ELD – video and audio codecs respectively.
- SIP – IETF signaling protocol for VoIP.
- STUN, TURN, and ICE – IETF technologies for traversing firewalls and NAT.
- RTP and SRTP – IETF standards for delivering real-time and encrypted media streams for VoIP.

Compared to most SIP implementations, FaceTime adds techniques that enhance performance at the cost of breaking interoperability: port multiplexing, SDP minimization, and SDP compression.

== FaceTime Audio ==
A audio-only version of FaceTime, named FaceTime Audio, was announced during the annual Apple Worldwide Developers Conference (WWDC) keynote speech on June 10, 2013, and released with iOS 7 on September 18, 2013. It effectively functions as a voice-over-internet protocol (VoIP).

Based on the same AAC-LD audio protocol, the service provides high-quality audio. The iOS 7 betas limited FaceTime Audio to calls placed on a Wi-Fi network (the same limitation originally imposed on the video version of FaceTime), but the final release removed that restriction to allow it to work over 3G and LTE data connections. Like the video version, FaceTime Audio is only available between Apple devices on iOS 7 and later. FaceTime streaming over cellular data is unavailable for the iPhone 4 and the iPad 2.

=== Walkie-Talkie ===
Walkie-Talkie is a limited FaceTime Audio-based communication feature made available on September 17, 2018, for Apple Watch devices running watchOS 5.0 or later. The application allows users to have two-person calls similar to using a real walkie-talkie, as conversations are push-to-talk and only one end of the conversation can speak at a time. Walkie-Talkie is intended for short and quick messages between two people rather than long conversations, which are better suited for traditional phone or video calls. Users can set their availability for walkie-talkie through the control panel or in the app itself, allowing friends to initiate a call at any time.

In July 2019, Apple temporarily disabled the Walkie-Talkie feature from all Apple Watches after a vulnerability was discovered that allowed a user to listen to another person's iPhone without consent.

== Limited availability ==
=== By country ===
As of June 2010, FaceTime was not enabled on devices bought in the United Arab Emirates, possibly due to national regulations restricting IP-based communications. FaceTime was made available for iPhones in the United Arab Emirates upon updating to iOS 13.6. In addition, iPhone and iPad (cellular models) devices bought in mainland China have FaceTime Audio, Group FaceTime, and the ability to create and join FaceTime links via the FaceTime app disabled, while FaceTime Video is available. Devices bought outside these countries support both video and audio versions of FaceTime. Although Egypt, Jordan, Qatar, and Kuwait originally disabled FaceTime on the iPhone 4, they later re-enabled the feature through a carrier update for existing phone owners and made it pre-enabled on any newly purchased iPhone. In March 2018, FaceTime was made available for iPhones in Saudi Arabia upon updating to iOS 11.3, and in August 2019, FaceTime was made available for iPhones in Pakistan upon updating to iOS 12.4. On 4th in December 2025 Russian federal agency Roskomnadzor started to block FaceTime.

=== By iOS version ===
As of April 16, 2014, FaceTime ceased working on earlier versions of iOS that had previously supported it (iOS 4 and later), due to the client-side certificate used to authenticate a genuine Apple device with FaceTime servers (amongst other uses) expiring on that date. Apple chose not to release an update to this certificate for all devices for which a newer major iOS version (with a new, valid certificate) was available. Apple did release a minor update, to the certificate only, for all OS X versions which could run FaceTime, and also for the 4th generation iPod Touch, the only iOS device which could run FaceTime but could not run the then-latest iOS 7. The result of this policy was that almost all iOS users had to update the iOS version on their devices if they wished to continue using FaceTime.

== Controversy ==
=== Group FaceTime bug ===
On January 28, 2019, a bug was discovered in the FaceTime app that allowed users to eavesdrop on other users without their knowledge through an exploit. It was later discovered the video feed could be enabled without the other users' acceptance. Apple said in a statement that it would release a fix for the exploit shortly, disabling Group FaceTime for the time being. The bug was named "FacePalm" by security researchers, and affects iOS devices running FaceTime on iOS 12.1 or Mac computers running macOS Mojave 10.14.1. On February 7, Apple fixed the FaceTime vulnerabilities in iOS 12.1.4 and a Supplemental Update for macOS Mojave 10.14.3.

Although the bug gained international attention on January 28, 2019, the bug was found much earlier by Arizona high school student Grant Thompson. He and his mother tried for more than a week to warn Apple about the problem through Facebook and Twitter after discovering the bug on January 20, without receiving answers.
