= Smarsh =

Software company based in Portland, Oregon, United States

Smarsh Inc.
- Type: Private
- Industry: Financial services, public sector
- Founded: 2001; 25 years ago
- Founder: Stephen Marsh
- Headquarters: 851 SW 6th Ave #800, Portland, Oregon, United States
- Number of locations: 11
- Area served: Worldwide
- Key people: Stephen Marsh, Chairman; Kim Crawford Goodman, CEO
- Products: Communications capture Regulatory archiving Communications surveillance eDiscovery; Call recording and analytics
- Number of employees: 1,400 (2026)
- Parent: K1 Investment Management
- Website: https://www.smarsh.com

Smarsh Inc. (stylized as smarsh) is an American AI-powered software company that develops software for communications compliance, archiving, supervision, and electronic discovery. The company provides products that are used mainly by organizations in regulated sectors, especially financial services and government.

Smarsh was founded in 2001 and initially focused on email archiving before expanding into web archiving, mobile and voice capture, cybersecurity, and AI-assisted surveillance through a series of acquisitions.

== History ==
The company was founded in Brooklyn, New York in 2001. The founder, Stephen Marsh, believed that the financial industry needed a better way to archive, store, and regulate its data as regulations required. In 2004, the company relocated its headquarters to Portland, Oregon.

In 2012, Quest Software, which owned 60% of Smarsh, was sold to Dell Computer. In 2013, Dell sold its stake to California investment firm Toba Capital.

In 2018, K1 Investment Management acquired Actiance and merged with Smarsh shortly after.

In 2020, Kim Crawford Goodman joined Smarsh as their new CEO.

In 2024, Smarsh entered a five-year strategic agreement with Amazon Web Services to develop generative AI offerings for financial services.

== Acquisitions ==
Smarsh has acquired a number of companies since its founding in 2001.

Date	Acquisition	Added value	Reference
2008	CentraScan	Email management service	
2008	Financial Visions Inc.	Website compliance	
2008	iNation, LLC	Financial CRM	
2012	Perpetually	Web archiving	
2015	Presensoft	Cloud-based instant message archiving	
2016	MobileGuard	Mobile communication monitoring and retention	
2017	Cognia	Improve Smarsh’s voice communication capabilities for mobile and landline devices	
2018	Actiance	K1 Investment Management acquired Actiance Inc. and merged with Smarsh	
2020	Digital Reasoning	Natural language processing and machine learning application, was added to Smarsh’s portfolio to expand AI-driven analysis and risk detection services	
2020	Entreda	Integrated cybersecurity risk and compliance management software and services	
2021	Privva	Cybersecurity risk assessment platform, integrated with Entreda	
2022	Digital Safe	Archiving and risk management portfolio from Micro Focus	
2024	TeleMessage	Archives Signal conversations	
2025	CallCabinet	AI voice recording and cloud analysis software	

== Operations ==
When first founded, Smarsh offered email archiving and compliance recordkeeping services. By 2012, American Banker reported that the company began preserving complex web content, including links, video, and social-media-related material, in response to regulatory scrutiny of digital communications.

Smarsh uses its “software as a service" (SaaS) platform to manage cloud-based messages across 100+ channels, including email, social media, mobile/text messaging, web and voice channels. It works with governance and supervision, enabling organizations to manage risk while capturing, retaining and archiving records. Since the 2020s, the company has integrated AI tools for risk detection analysis and customer support.

== Reception ==
Smarsh was listed as one of the Gartner Magic Quadrant leaders for Digital Communications Governance and Archiving in 2024 and 2025.

In 2025, Amazon Web Services named Smarsh as its “Vertical Technology Partner of the Year” and USA Today included the company on its “Top Workplaces” ranking. Smarsh was also listed on Inc.’s 5000 list for its 18th consecutive year.
