= Brian McCormack (lobbyist) =

American government official

Brian Vaughan McCormack is an American government official, lobbyist, and political consultant.

McCormack is chief of staff for the U.S. National Security Council, the former chief of staff for Secretary of Energy Rick Perry, a former executive for the Edison Electric Institute, and formerly served multiple roles in the George W. Bush administration. McCormack has written legislation for the conservative American Legislative Exchange Council.

In November 2019, McCormack defied a congressional subpoena and refused to testify during the impeachment inquiry into Donald Trump. In March 2025, McCormack was part of the United States government group chat leak, where a group of U.S. national security leaders used insecure communications services and personal devices to conduct a group chat on the Signal messaging service about imminent military operations against the Houthis in Yemen.
