= Actiance =

American computing and communications company

Actiance Inc
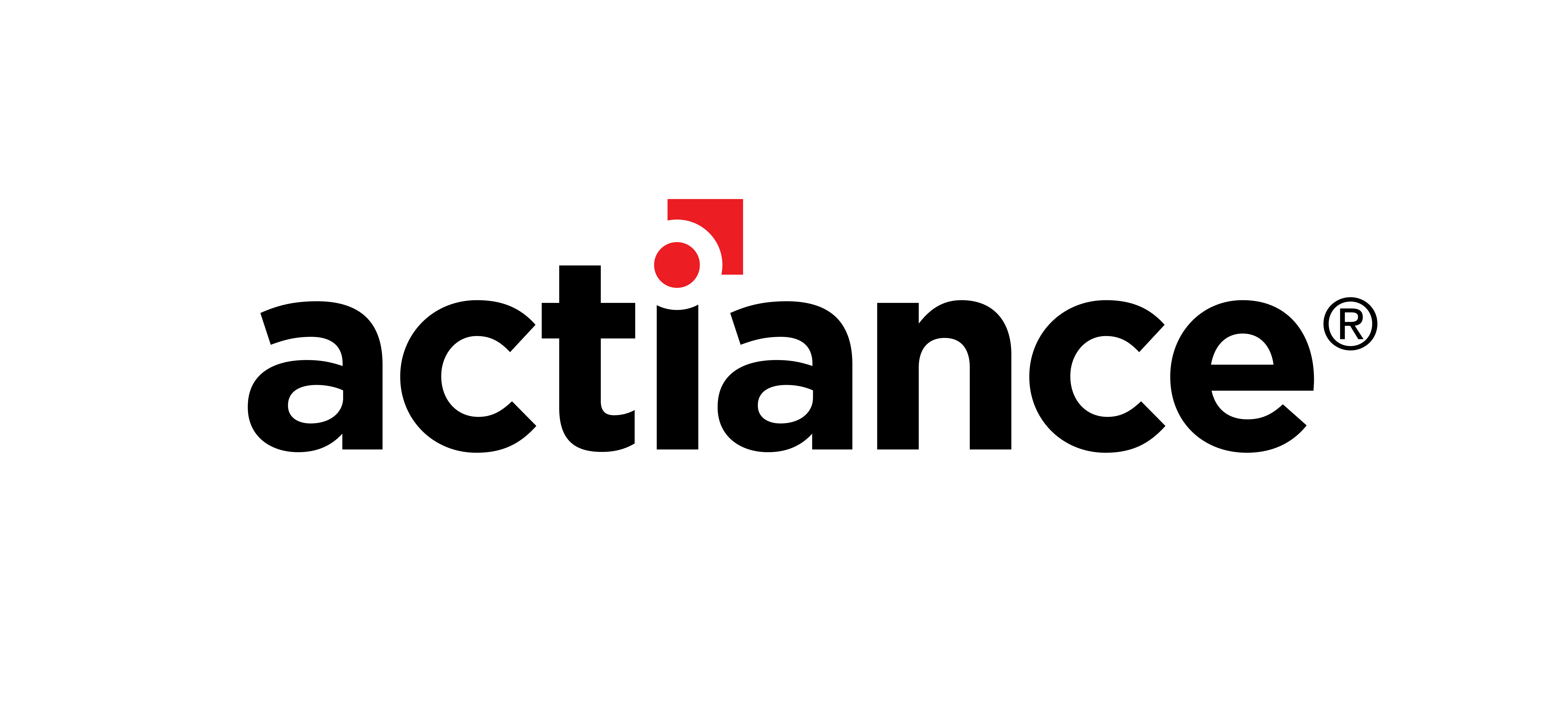
- Company type: Private company
- Industry: Computer software Computer security Regulatory compliance Unified communications
- Predecessor: FaceTime Communications
- Founded: 1997; 29 years ago
- Headquarters: Redwood City, CA
- Area served: Worldwide
- Key people: Kailash Ambwani (CEO)
- Products: Socialite Enable; Socialite Engage; Unified Security Gateway (USG); Vantage
- Revenue: $30,000,000 (2023)
- Website: Actiance.com

Actiance Inc. (formerly known as FaceTime Communications) was an American-based multinational corporation that developed platforms required to enable security, management, and compliance of unified communications, Web 2.0, and social media channels. Headquartered in Redwood City, California, Actiance supported social networks, unified communications providers and Instant Messaging platforms, including Facebook, LinkedIn, Twitter, AOL, Google, Yahoo!, Skype, Microsoft, IBM and Cisco.

== History ==
=== 1997–2007 ===
Established in 1997, Actiance provided call center support and CRM enablement for instant messaging, web chat, and email. Working with AOL, Yahoo!, MSN, and Microsoft, Actiance established the industry's first CAP agreements (Certified Access Programs), providing enhanced access to public IM networks. In 2000, Actiance was awarded "Most Innovative Use of Real-time Collaboration" at the Microsoft Exchange Conference.

In 2001, the company launched its first compliance and security solution for IM networks called IM Auditor. Targeted specifically at the financial services sector that needed to comply with government regulations, it enabled financial services organizations to leverage the power of public instant messaging networks from AOL, Microsoft, and Yahoo! for time-sensitive communications while ensuring administrative controls were in place to comply with government regulations.

By 2003, over 50% of the Top 100 financial services firms worldwide that needed to comply with Securities and Exchange Commission and NASD recorded retention and supervisory requirements using IM Auditor.

In 2004, Actiance introduced the Real Time Guardian (RTG), a gateway for filtering unauthorised IM connections and ceasing peer-to-peer (P2P) file sharing on sites such as KaZaA, Grokster and Morpheus. Actiance added features to RTG, including support for unified communication platforms such as Microsoft Office Communications Server and IBM Lotus Sametime. In 2005, a zero-day defense system was added.

=== 2008–present ===
In 2008, Actiance added new capabilities to RTG's successor, Unified Security Gateway (USG), providing IT managers with management, security, and control over 140 social networking sites, 20,000 individual Facebook widgets, and over 400 Web and real-time applications. Making USG the first secure Web gateway to combine content monitoring, management, and security of Web 2.0 applications, such as social networks, instant messaging, and Unified Communications, with URL filtering, malware, and Web antivirus protection.

2010 saw another first for Actiance when it launched Vantage, IMAuditor's successor, which included stringent security and compliance controls for Skype in the enterprise. Vantage provides granular security, policy controls, and compliance features for real-time and unified communications (UC) – providing management for the widest variety of UC and real-time communications platforms; including Microsoft Office Communications Server, and IBM Lotus Sametime, public instant messaging platforms such as Windows Live and Skype, web conferencing and industry-focused networks like Reuters, Bloomberg, and YellowJacket. Later that same year, it included support for Microsoft Lync Server.

In 2010, Actiance also launched Socialite Enable, a security, management, and compliance solution for enterprises using social networks. Socialite provides granular control of applications such as Facebook, LinkedIn, and Twitter, and allows organizations to comply with regulatory compliance demanded by organizations such as the Financial Industry Regulatory Authority (FINRA) and the Financial Services Authority. As both a software-as-a-service deployment (SaaS) or as an on-premises installation as a module of USG, Socialite Enable allows for organizations to control social media features and communications for users both on the corporate network and situated remotely.

In January 2011, FaceTime Communications announced it had changed its name to "Actiance" following the purchase of the FaceTime brand by Apple.

In June 2011, Actiance announced Socialite Engage, a new platform that allows distributed teams to share content, engage with clients and prospects, and analyze the impact of the content on social media sites. Designed specifically to enable investment and insurance professionals to distribute pre-approved content, Socialite Engage enables any organization to manage social media in a secure and compliant environment. It also leverages third-party data sources, such as internal systems and data feeds; highlights channels that are the most effective; and identifies potential sales leads.

In 2017, Actiance merged with the Portland company Smarsh, which provides archiving solutions for compliance and risk management. Both companies are currently owned by K1 Investment Management.
