= 2020s European rearmament =

Funding and reindustrialisation of European militaries

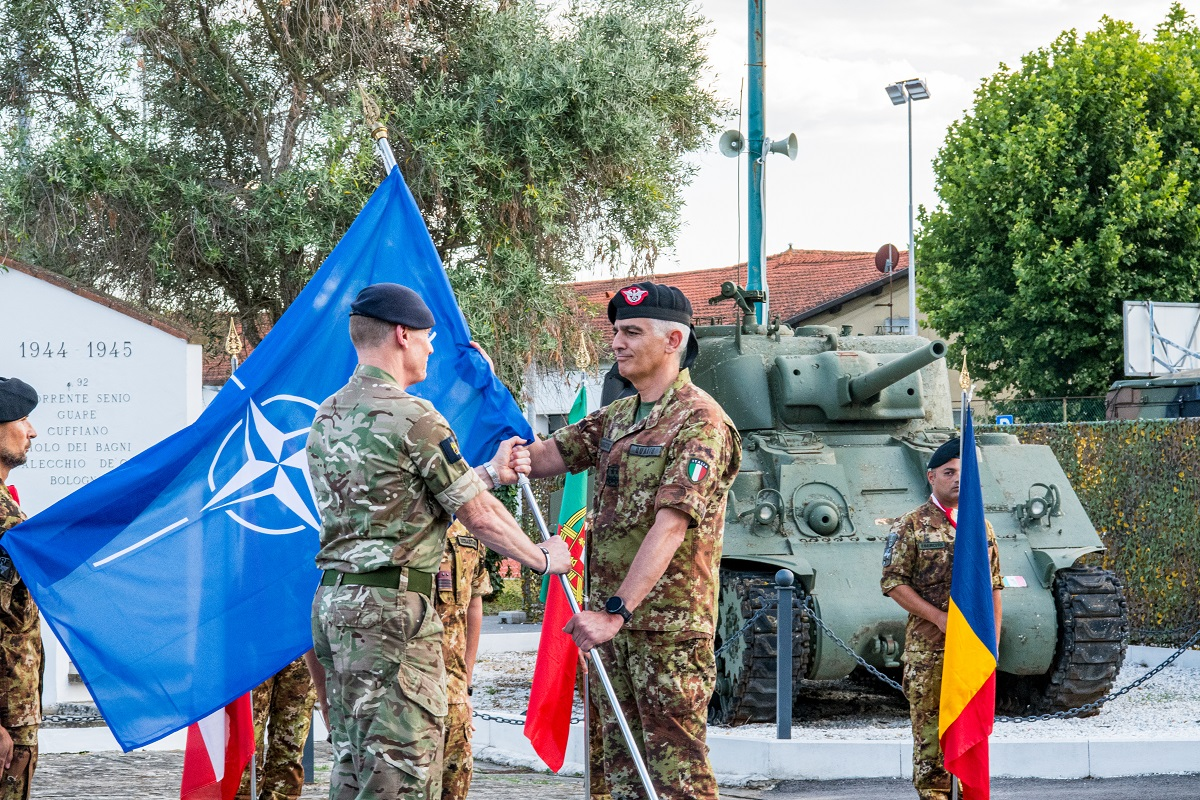
European NATO members in Italy, 2025

The 2020s have seen a significant strategic realignment in European defence and security policy, due to heightened regional geopolitical risk and strained international military alliances. The Russian invasion of Ukraine in 2022 amid broader U.S. geopolitical pressure on Europe in later years, especially due to geopolitical uncertainty from the United States created by the second presidency of Donald Trump, led to a material increase in defence spending among European countries. The European Union's defence spending increased 60% from 2020 to 2025. European military demonstrations increased markedly after the U.S. threatened to annex Greenland in 2026 and the U.S.-Israeli war in Iran affected regional stability in Southern Europe.

This transformation is characterised by increased domestic defence manufacturing, military research and development, reindustrialization, and greater military integration within the European Union. European states seek autonomous defence capabilities independent of NATO and the United States.

== History ==
Prior to the 2020s, the European Union maintained its Common Security and Defence Policy that focused primarily on crisis management and peacekeeping operations. The EU successfully deployed approximately 40 international missions under this framework. However, the bloc remained heavily dependent on NATO and United States military support for territorial defence, despite provisions in the EU Treaty allowing for the creation of common defence mechanisms and mutual assistance agreements between member states.

=== Military inefficacy ===
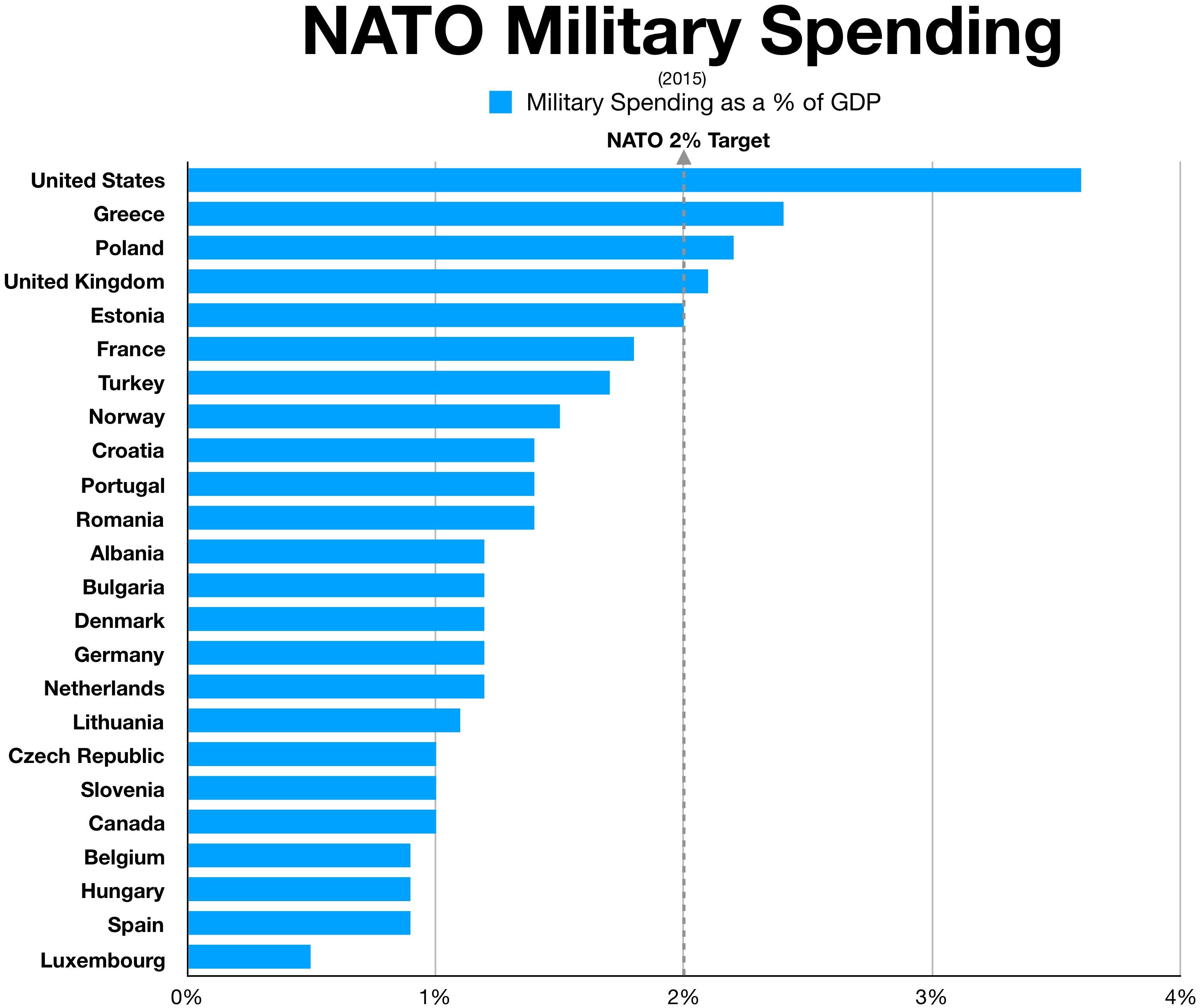
Graph of NATO military spending per nation in 2015, prior to rearmament efforts in Europe

By early 2024, there were significant disparities among NATO member states. Of the alliance's 32 members, only 18 had achieved or committed to reaching the agreed-upon target of spending 2% of GDP on defence. This represented a marked decrease from historical Cold War spending levels, when European NATO members typically allocated between 3% and 5% of their national GDP to defence expenditures. Areas described as lacking included integrated anti-aircraft defence systems and deep precision strike capabilities deemed inadequate for contemporary threats, as well as significant vulnerabilities in command and control infrastructure and logistical systems. These deficiencies emerged despite the adoption of new regional defence plans at the 2023 Vilnius NATO summit.

Despite promised commitments to increased military spending by European leaders, many European nations failed to convert their pledges into concrete manufacturing contracts. This hampered the expansion of defence manufacturing capabilities necessary for both supporting Ukraine against Russia's invasion and replenishing NATO's own military stocks. Nations along NATO's eastern flank demonstrated greater urgency in military modernisation efforts, while European nations further west generally showed less immediacy in their approach to defence spending and capability development.

Analysis from the European Defence Agency identified that lack of cooperation between member states resulted in annual inefficiencies of approximately €25 billion. Despite EU members collectively spending roughly one-third of U.S. defence expenditures, their combined capabilities amounted to only about 10% of American military capacity. Member nations also faced challenges regarding the allocation of resources between defence spending and social welfare programs, especially among nations such as Germany with ongoing economic crises.

On April 22, 2026, Germany unveiled its first standalone military strategy since the Second World War, titled "Verantwortung für Europa" (Responsibility for Europe), presented by Defence Minister Boris Pistorius. The package included a new capability profile, a personnel growth plan targeting expansion from 185,000 active-duty soldiers to 260,000 by the mid-2030s alongside a reserve buildup to at least 200,000, and an administrative reform agenda comprising 153 concrete measures.

=== Geopolitical shifts ===
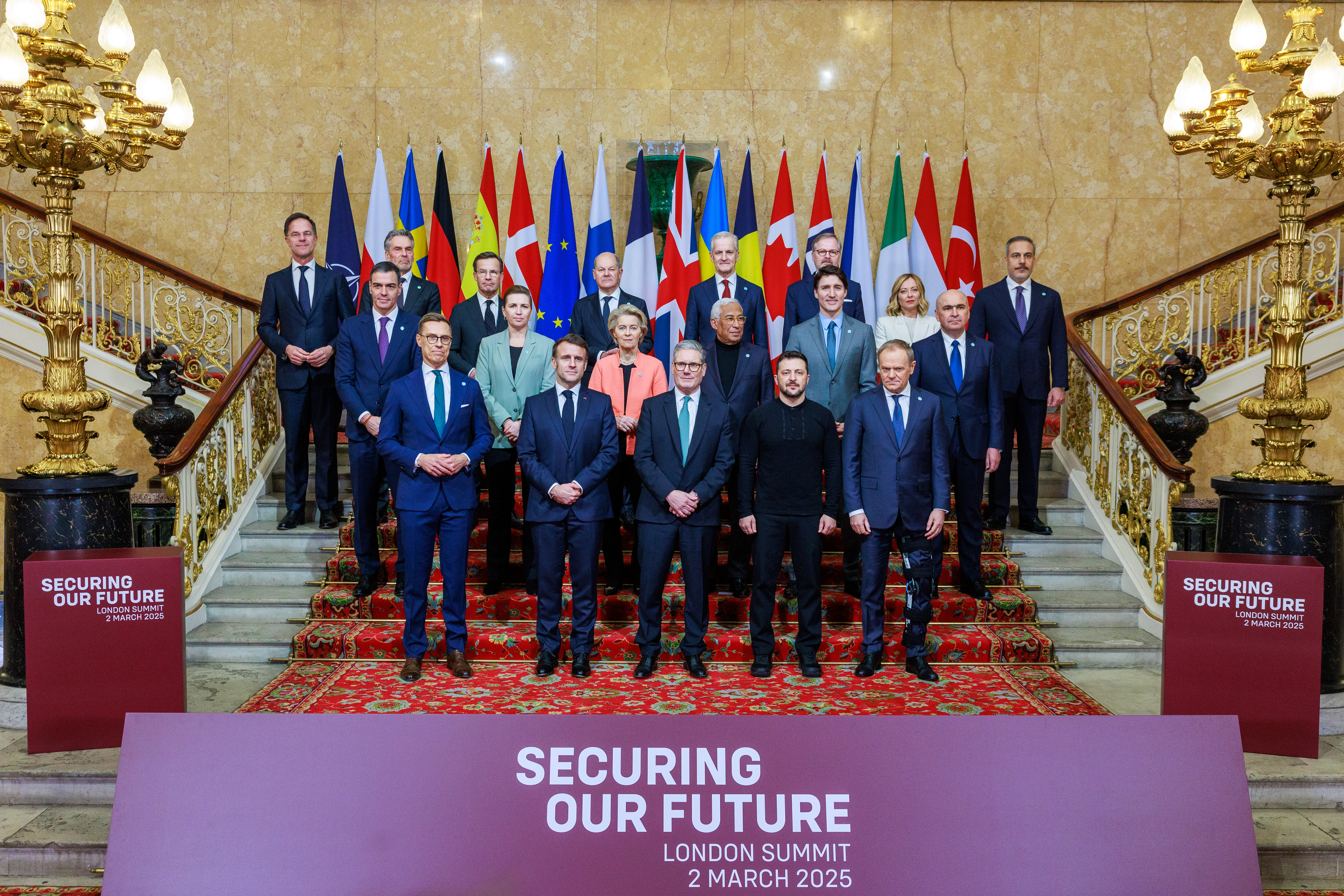
Participants at the 2 March 2025 London Summit on Ukraine

The United States began shifting its strategic focus from Europe to the Indo-Pacific region during the Obama administration, with both Democratic and Republican establishments increasingly viewing China, rather than Russia, as their primary strategic competitor. This shift continued through subsequent administrations, reducing American military emphasis on European defence.

The return of Donald Trump to the U.S. presidency in 2025 introduced significant uncertainty into transatlantic security relationships. Trump's scepticism toward NATO, suggestions that the U.S. might not defend allies who failed to meet certain financial obligations, and his threats against NATO-founding members Canada and Denmark created new urgency for European military self-sufficiency. Additional concerns arose regarding potential U.S. positions on conflicts affecting European security, particularly regarding Russia and Ukraine amid the former's invasion of Ukrainian territory. These included Trump's call and meetings with Russian president Vladimir Putin discussing peace negotiations without input from Ukraine or European parties, statements made by United States Secretary of Defense Pete Hegseth critical of the lack of equal military contributions from European nations, and a speech made by United States vice president JD Vance at the 61st Munich Security Conference critical of European governance for annulling elections in favour of less anti-Russian candidates. Analysts argued that by 2026 these pressures had not remained compartmentalized, but were interacting and accumulating simultaneously within the same EU decision-making structures — converging with energy volatility, fiscal strain, and migration to constrain coherent European policymaking within increasingly narrow margins.

=== Rearmament efforts ===
In March 2024, the EU's von der Leyen Commission released the European Defence Industrial Strategy, which suggested a switch to "war economy mode" due to the Russian invasion of Ukraine and fears over Trump's rumoured withdrawal from NATO. European Commissioner for Internal Market Thierry Breton said: "Europe must take greater responsibility for its own security, regardless of the outcome of our allies' elections every four years." The strategy established several ambitious targets for 2030, including requirements for EU member states to allocate 50% of their procurement budgets to purchases from Europe's industrial defence sector.

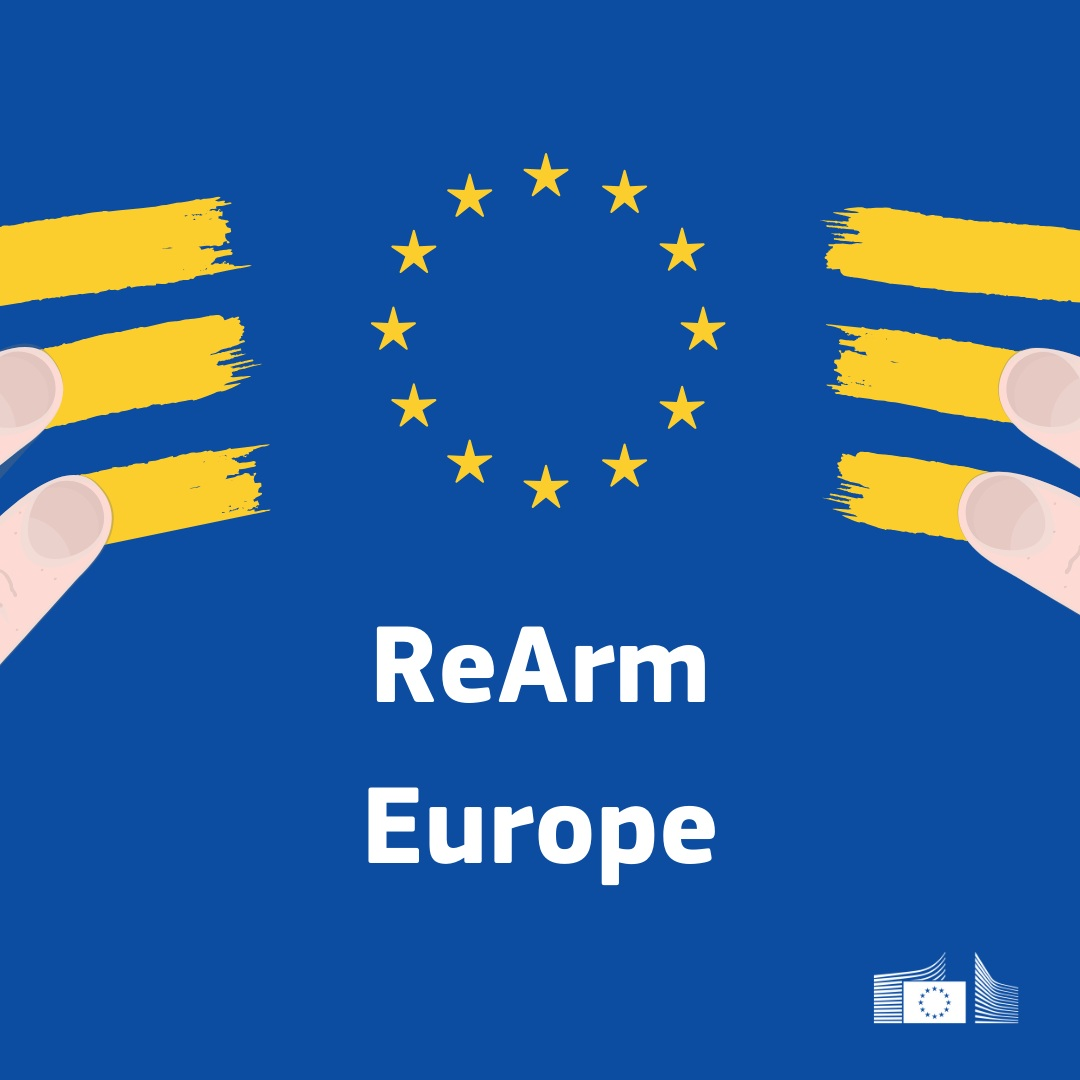
Image of the ReArm Europe initiative posted by the European Commission on social media

The plan also aimed to increase collaborative equipment procurement from 18% to 40% and raise intra-European Union defence trade to 35% of the overall EU defence market value. The strategy also introduced the European Defence Industry Programme (EDIP) with an initial allocation of €1.5 billion for 2025–2027. This program aimed to incentivise joint weapons production and enhance collaboration between defence manufacturers across member states. The document also advocated for the incorporation of Ukraine into European defence, including Ukrainian industry participation in EU defence programs, establishment of an EU-Ukraine Defence Industry Forum, and the creation of an EU Defence Innovation Office in Kyiv to exchange combat experience and technological insights.

The €1.5 billion allocated fell significantly short of the €100 billion fund suggested by Breton. Various funding mechanisms were proposed, including the potential use of frozen Russian state assets and adjustments to European Investment Bank lending policies to include defence projects. In February 2025, NATO initiated discussions to substantially increase its defence spending targets for member nations above the previous 2% GDP benchmark established a decade earlier. NATO Secretary General Mark Rutte announced during the 61st Munich Security Conference that alliance members would need to increase their military spending to "considerably more than 3 percent" of their national GDP. This statement came in response to U.S. calls for members to reach 5% of GDP in defence expenditure. On 14 February 2025, President of the European Commission Ursula von der Leyen advocated for activating an emergency clause to facilitate increased defence spending by EU member states. The clause would forego typical strict budget deficit limits for member states, and would enable increased defence spending without requiring corresponding budget cuts in other areas.

Poland and the Baltic states demonstrated willingness to approach high spending levels to address potential threats from Russia. Nordic countries have also significantly increased their defense budgets. France, along with Southern European nations with high debt levels including Italy and Greece, also supported the initiative. Northern European countries with fiscally conservative governments such as the Netherlands, Germany, and Sweden expressed opposition to new debt issuance during treasury discussions. The United Kingdom, advocated for more moderate targets between 2.5% and 3.5% of GDP. On 4 March 2025, von der Leyen proposed ReArm Europe, a five-point plan to boost defence spending by up to €800 billion, including €150 billion in loans to EU member states. This came a day after Trump halted all military aid to Ukraine.

== National changes ==
=== Austria ===
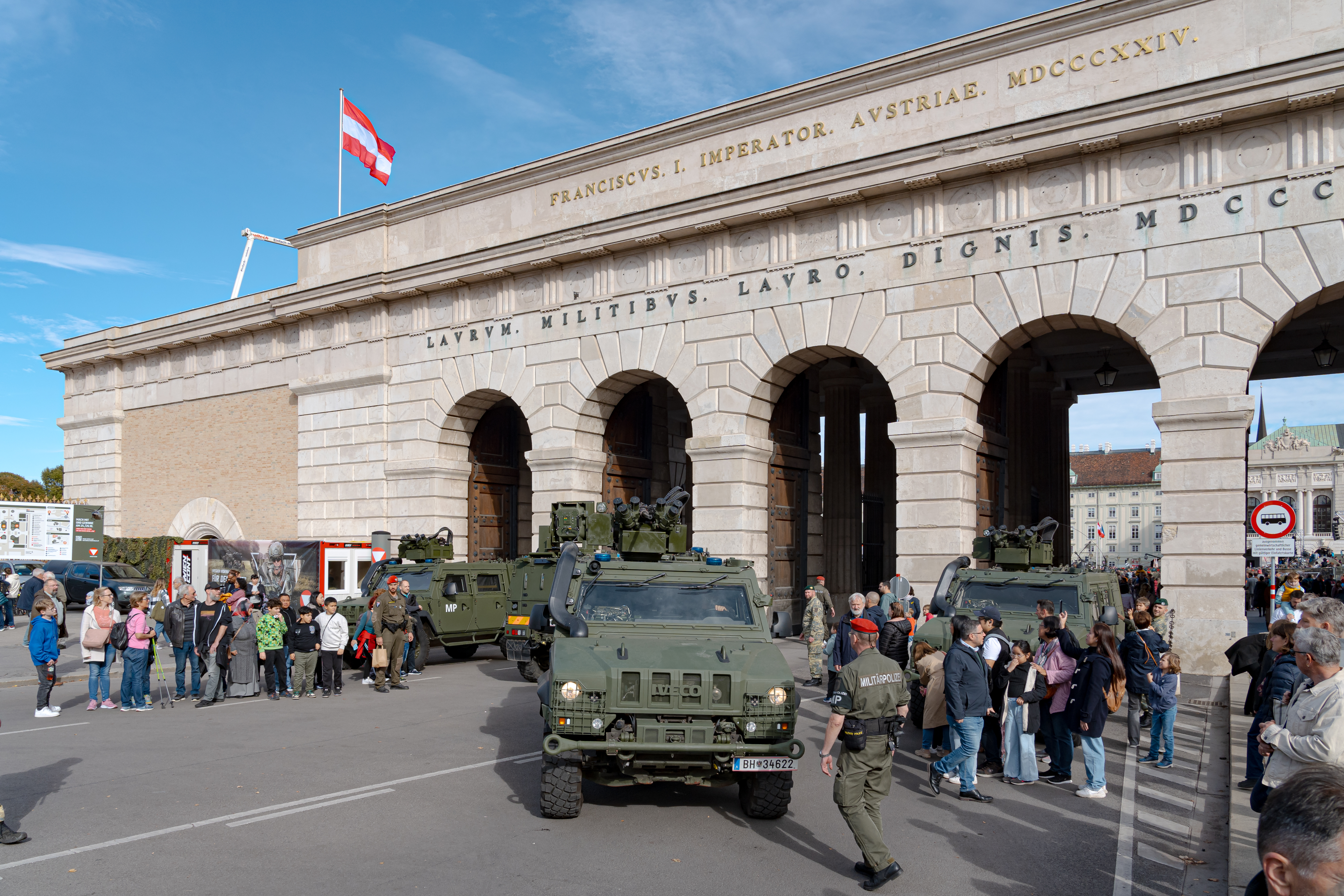
The Austrian Armed Forces patrolling Vienna in 2023

With their long-standing military neutrality, Austria announced plans to double their defence budget from 2025 to 2032 after which it will hit 2% of GDP on such spending. The Austrian government confirmed a planned $5.8 billion acquisition of advanced air defence systems as well as next generation fighter jets and helicopters.

=== Belgium ===
In March 2025, Belgium announced plans to increase defence spending by €4 billion by mid-year, bringing defence expenditures from 1.31% of the country's GDP to 2%. Prime Minister Bart De Wever called their planned 5% spending target a necessary but "bitter pill" as the nation announced it may take a decade to achieve.

=== Croatia ===
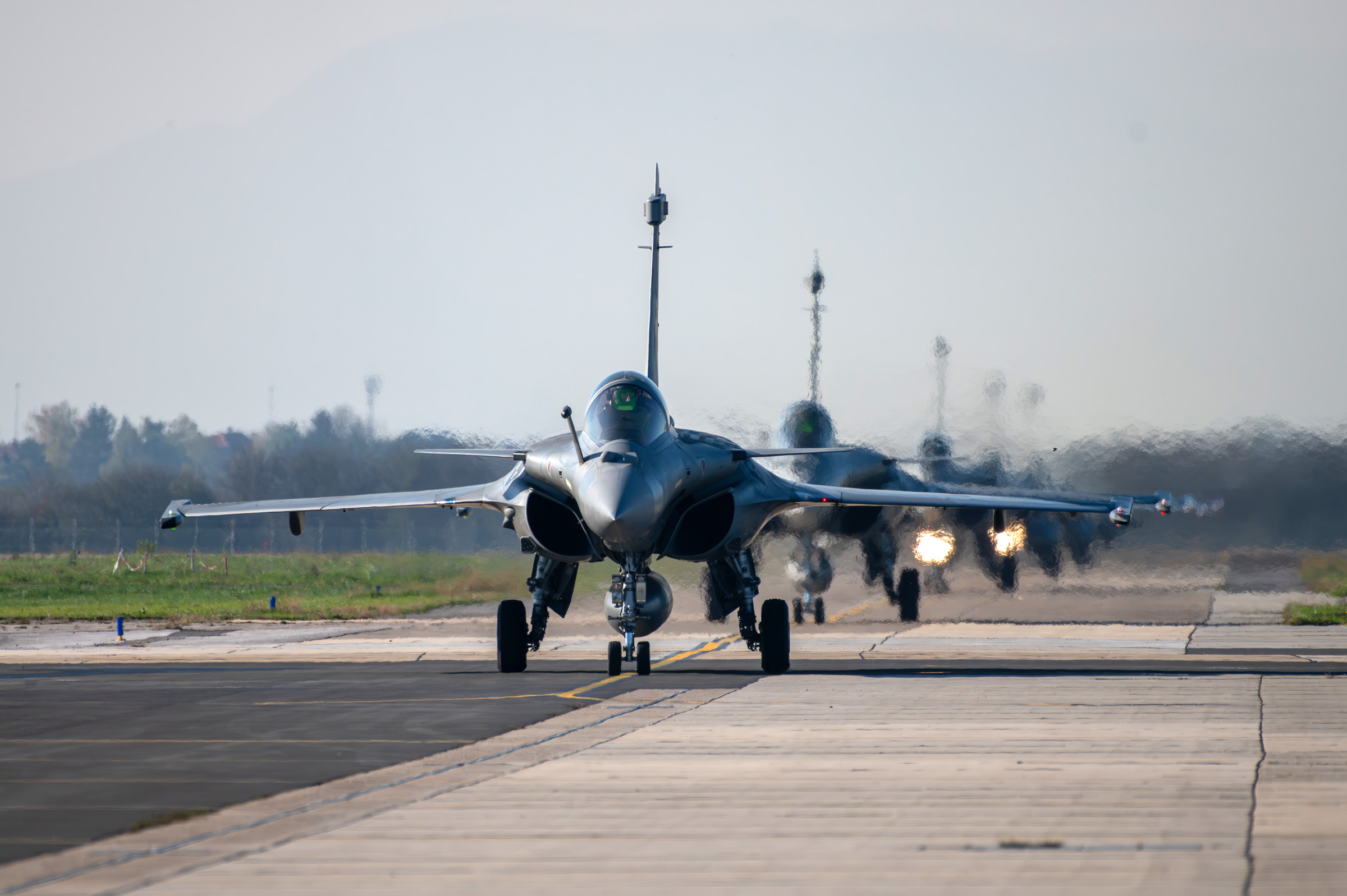
The Croatian Armed Forces modernized their entire combat aircraft fleet in 2025.

In May 2025, Croatia brought their defence spending to 2% of their GDP, with a stated objective of 3% of GDP by 2030. A month later, Croatia entered into a regional defence pact with neighboring Albania and Kosovo. A comprehensive multi-year modernization of their combat air fleet was completed that year. The Croatian Parliament reenacted military conscription in October. Later that month the parliament approved a €2 billion military budget focused on modernization initiatives continuing to 2030. Croatia's planned procurement of advanced Israeli military assets in 2026 was met with domestic controversy over the Israeli war in Gaza.

=== Denmark ===
In February 2025, Denmark announced a significant increase in defence spending to 3% of national GDP, an increase from 2.4% in 2024. This increase, implemented through a 50 billion Danish kroner "acceleration fund" represented the highest level of Danish defence spending in over fifty years. The Danish government emphasised rapid procurement of military equipment, with defence minister Troels Lund Poulsen warning that Russia could threaten NATO countries within two years without appropriate counter-measures.

=== Estonia ===
In February 2025, Estonia confirmed their intention to allocate more than 4% of the country's GDP to defence spending by 2026.

=== France ===
In February 2025, French president Emmanuel Macron characterised Russia as an "existential threat" to Europe, convening a special meeting in Paris to coordinate European responses under the Weimar+ framework. Macron also stated his willingness to send ground troops to Ukraine for combat against Russia if necessary. In March 2026, Macron announced his intent to spread France's nuclear warheads across continental Europe as extended deterrence within the region's nuclear umbrella.

=== Finland ===
In March 2026, Finland waived its long-standing ban on hosting nuclear weapons on Finnish territory. On 1 April 2025, the Finnish government announced its intention to leave the Ottawa Treaty. The Finnish parliament voted to withdraw from the convention on 19 June 2025. The instrument of withdrawal was presented to the United Nations on 10 July 2025 and the withdrawal took effect on 10 January 2026.

In April 2026, Finland signed a deal worth €546 million to purchase an additional 112 K9 Thunder self-propelled howitzers from South Korea.

=== Germany ===
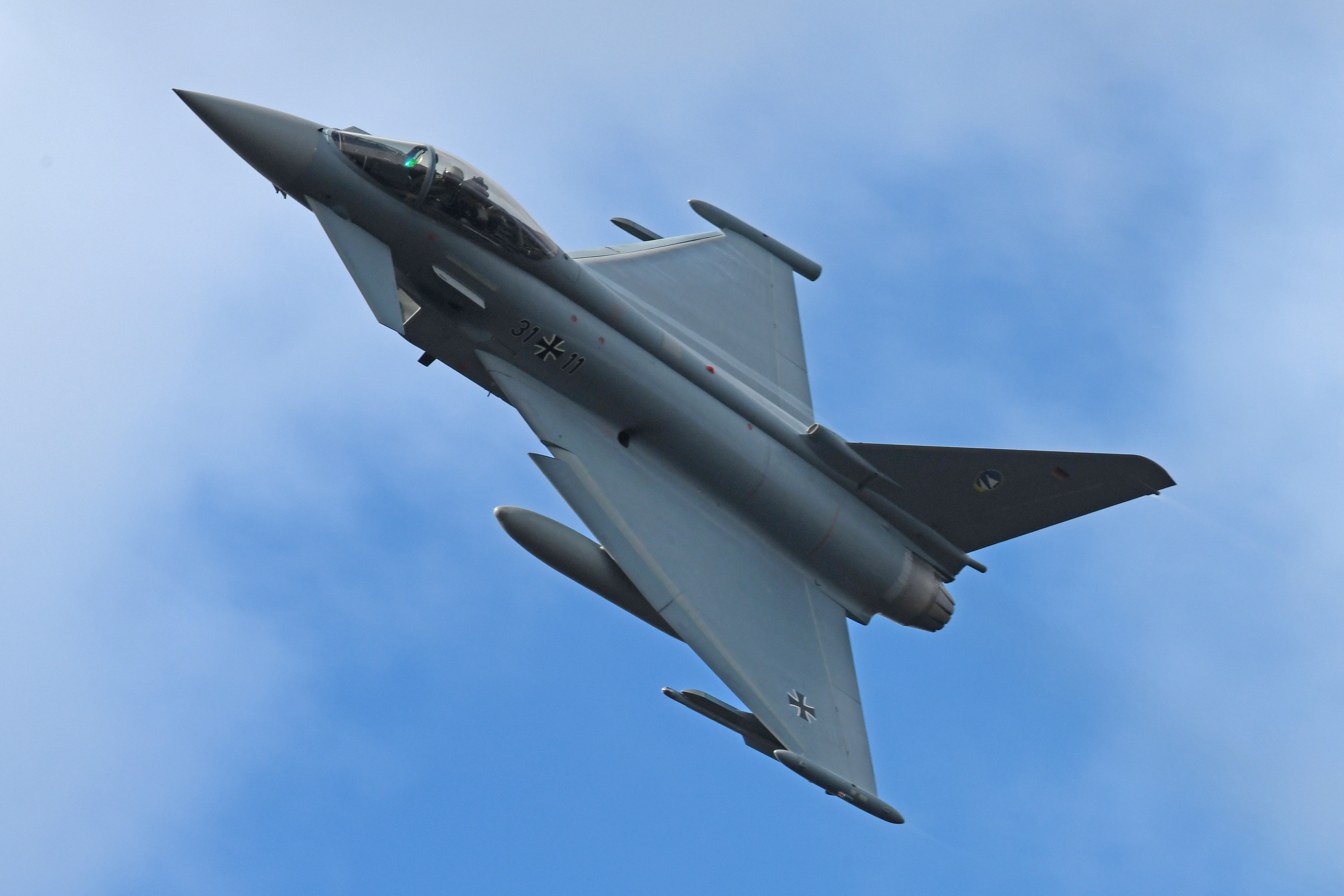
A German Eurofighter, 2022

Following German reunification in 1990, the country's defence industry experienced substantial downsizing, with employment in the sector declining by approximately 60% from 290,000 to 100,000 jobs. Political attitudes during this period from leaders such as Vice Chancellor Sigmar Gabriel in 2014 often expressed reluctance to engage with the defence industry.

A €100 billion special defence fund established in 2022 provided initial resources for military procurement. Projections in 2024 indicated this funding would be depleted by 2027, creating an estimated annual funding gap of €50 billion for continued defence modernisation efforts. Much of Germany's military equipment procurement at the time remained dependent on foreign manufacturing, such as the procurement of military vehicles being dependent on Rheinmetall's Australian facilities. By early 2024, opposition parties, particularly the CDU/CSU, criticised the government's pace of industrial expansion, comparing it unfavourably to Russia's rapid military–industrial mobilisation. Within the governing traffic light coalition, the Green Party expressed concerns about ensuring eventual scalability reduction when security conditions improved.

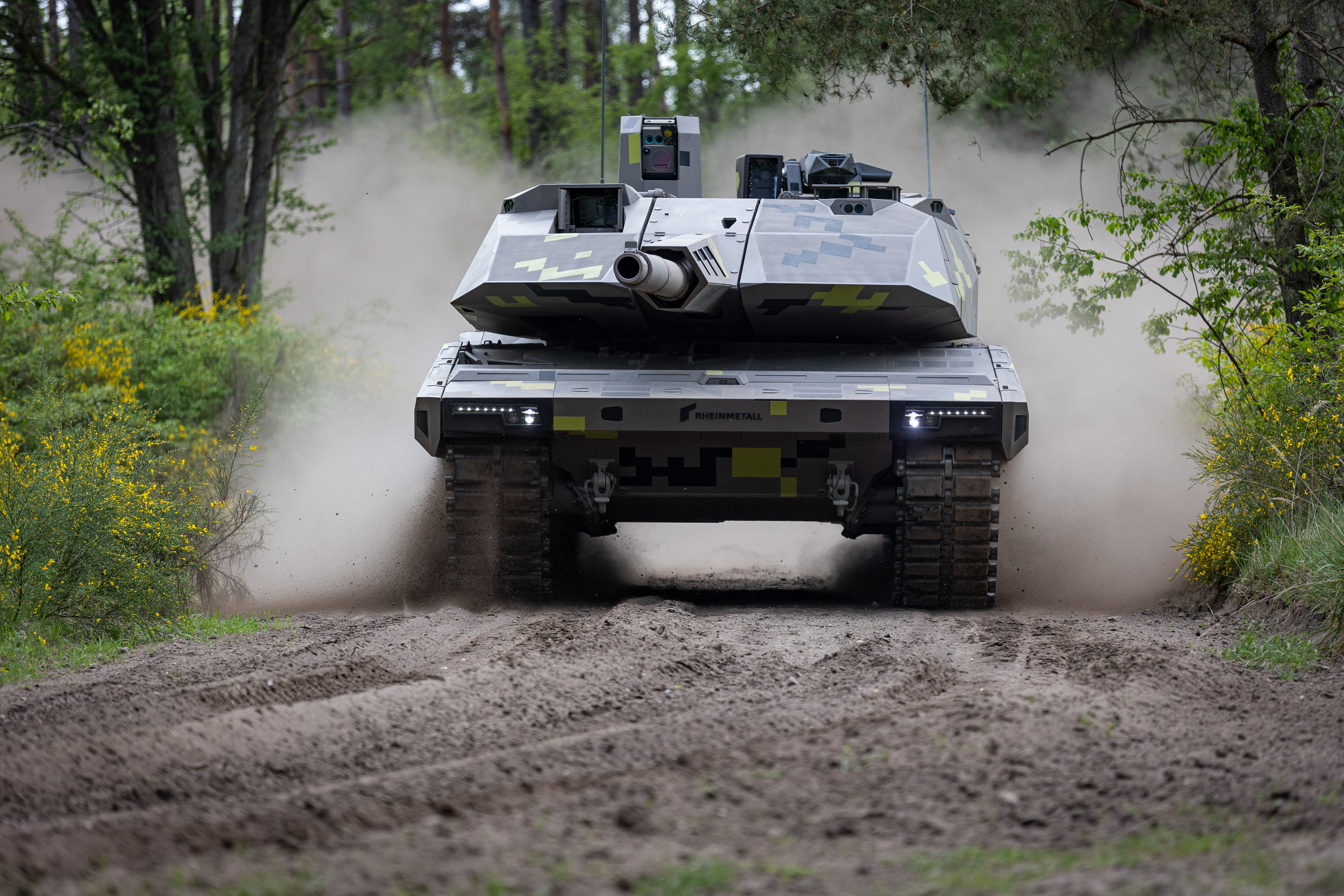
A German Panther KF51 battle tank produced by Rheinmetall, 2022

In March 2024, German chancellor Olaf Scholz emphasised the need for sustained arms manufacturing capacity rather than depending on military procurement through purchasing transactions. In Troisdorf, North Rhine-Westphalia, citizens and local politicians protested against Diehl Defence's planned ammunition factory, citing concerns about required security zones and land use conflicts. Similar resistance emerged in Saxony regarding potential Rheinmetall facilities. In April 2024, vice chancellor and Green Party member Robert Habeck declared that he viewed his role as a "defence industry minister", despite his party's traditionally pacifist stance.

Rheinmetall experienced unprecedented growth as a military producer in 2024. Rheinmetall initiated a €1.3 billion investment programme to expand ammunition production capabilities across multiple countries, including Australia, Romania, Hungary, and Ukraine, while planning to establish an armored vehicle manufacturing facility in Ukraine. Rheinmetall CEO Armin Papperger called U.S. president Donald Trump's demands for greater military spending across EU nations a "wake-up call".

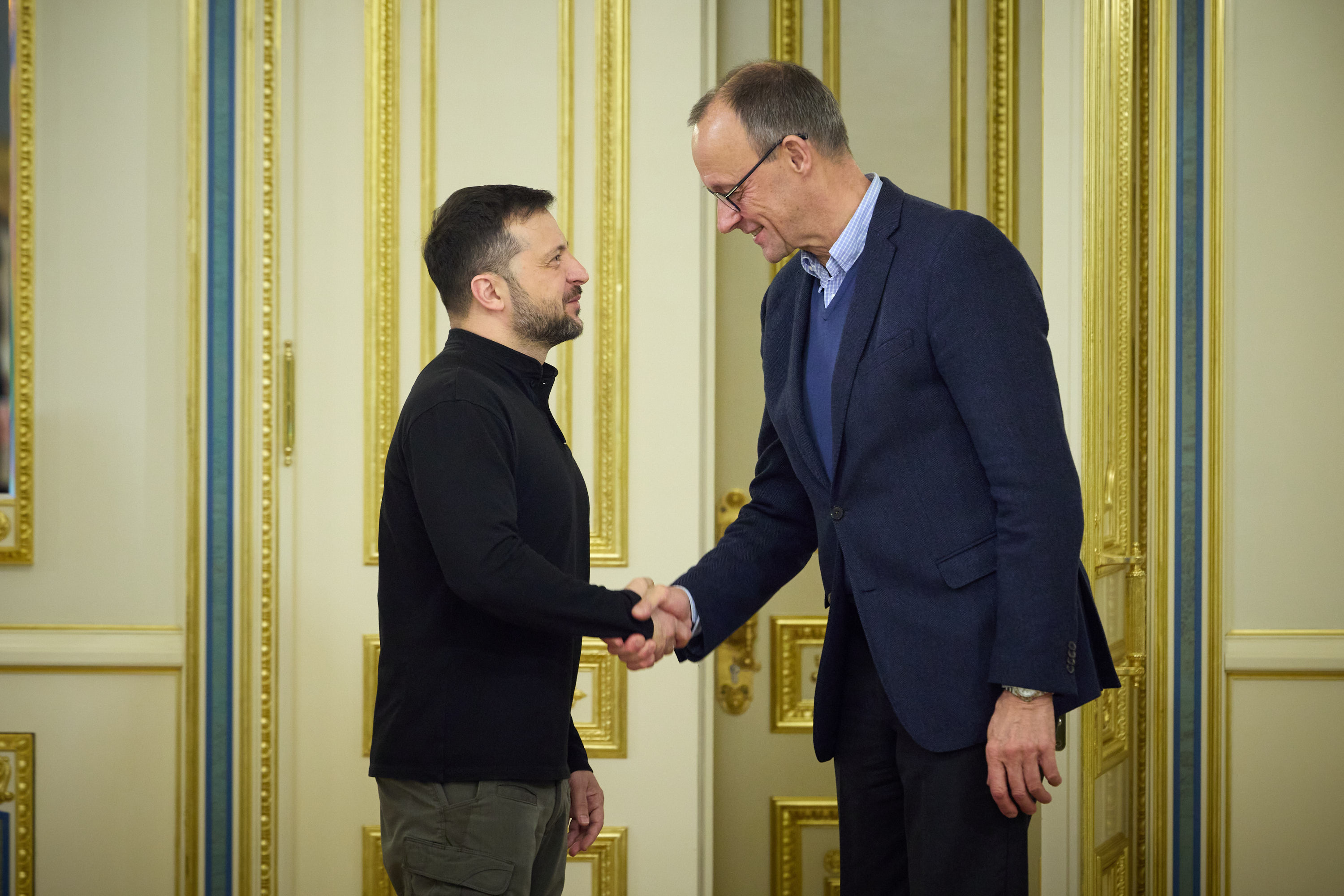
Future German Chancellor Friedrich Merz discussing military aid with Ukrainian President Volodymyr Zelenskyy, 2024

In February 2025, a spokesperson for Germany's defence ministry stated that it would send ground troops to Ukraine if necessary. Later that month, Germany’s chancellor-in-waiting Friedrich Merz proposed a significant increase in defence spending. He stated at the press conference: "Germany and Europe must quickly strengthen their defence capabilities. The CDU, CSU and SPD will table a motion to amend the Basic Law so that defence spending above 1% of GDP is exempt from the debt brake." This would allow Germany to increase its debt without limits in order to finance its military and provide military assistance to Ukraine.

During negotiations on the next German cabinet, Friedrich Merz and chancellor Olaf Scholz reached an agreement to reform the debt brake by changing sections of the Basic Law to exempt defence spending exceeding 1% of GDP. In March 2025, German lawmakers approved an amendment to the Basic Law, allowing the German government to implement the most massive rearmament in Germany since World War II. The change will allow Merz's government to massively increase spending by around €400 billion on defence and security, and €500 billion on infrastructure and green energy.

=== Ireland ===
The Irish government's defence spending in 2025 was reported to be a record €1.35 billion, with a commitment to increase to €1.5 billion by 2028.

As of October 2026, the Irish government voted to scrap the triple lock which prevented the Irish army from being deployed without UN permission.

=== Italy ===
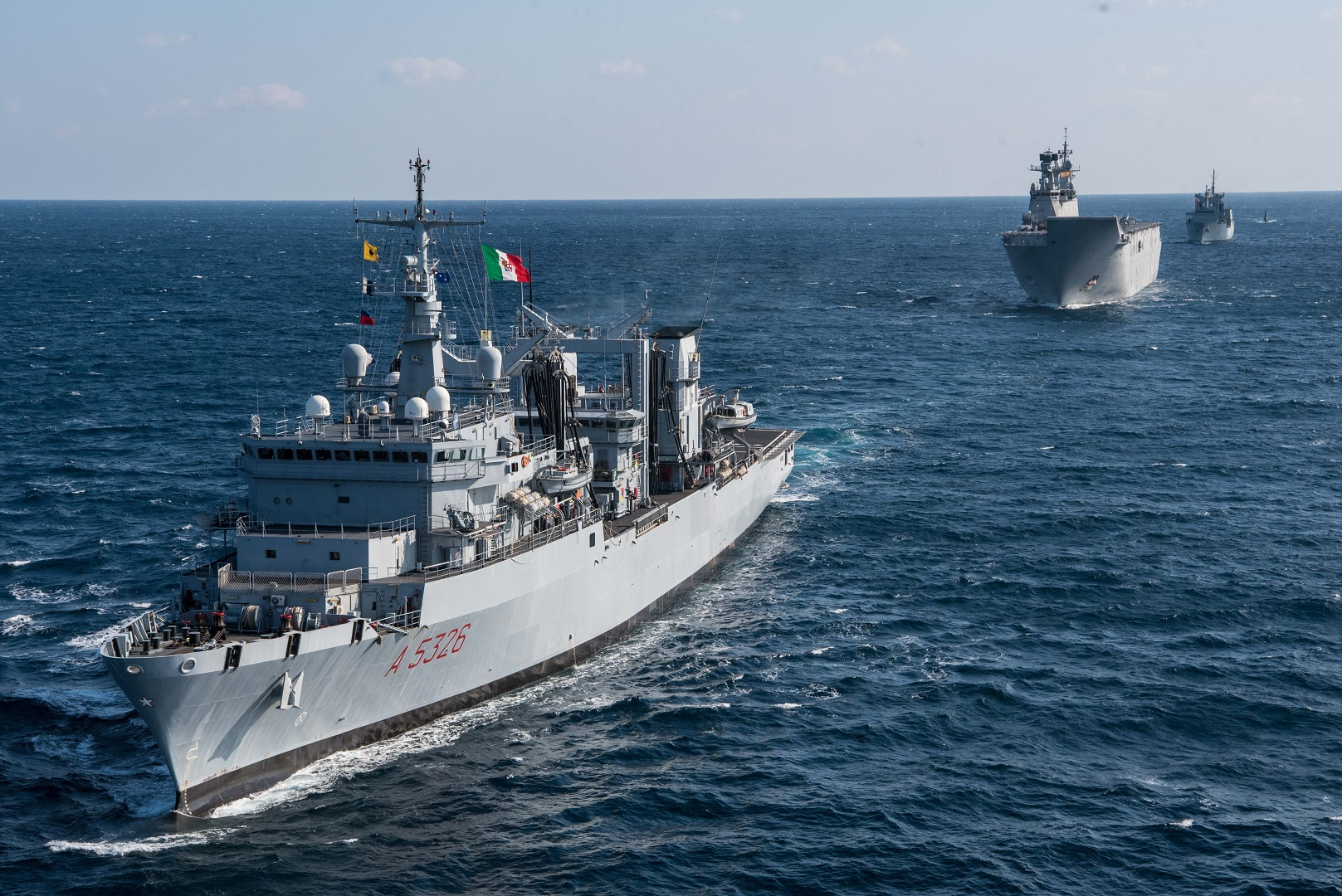
The Italian Navy in 2025

The Italian government announced a major expansion of military infrastructure in 2025, with a stated objective of hitting 3.5% of GDP in defence spending by 2035. It approved the construction of the Strait of Messina Bridge, a suspension bridge between mainland Italy and the island of Sicily. The bridge would serve as a strategic gateway to "key Italian and U.S. military bases".

=== Latvia ===
In 2014, only 0.94% of Latvia's GDP was allocated to defence spending. On 19 February 2025, Latvian defence minister Andris Sprūds and Latvian prime minister Evika Siliņa stated that Latvia would assign at least 4% of the country's GDP to defence in 2026, with the intention of raising it to 5% over time.

=== Lithuania ===
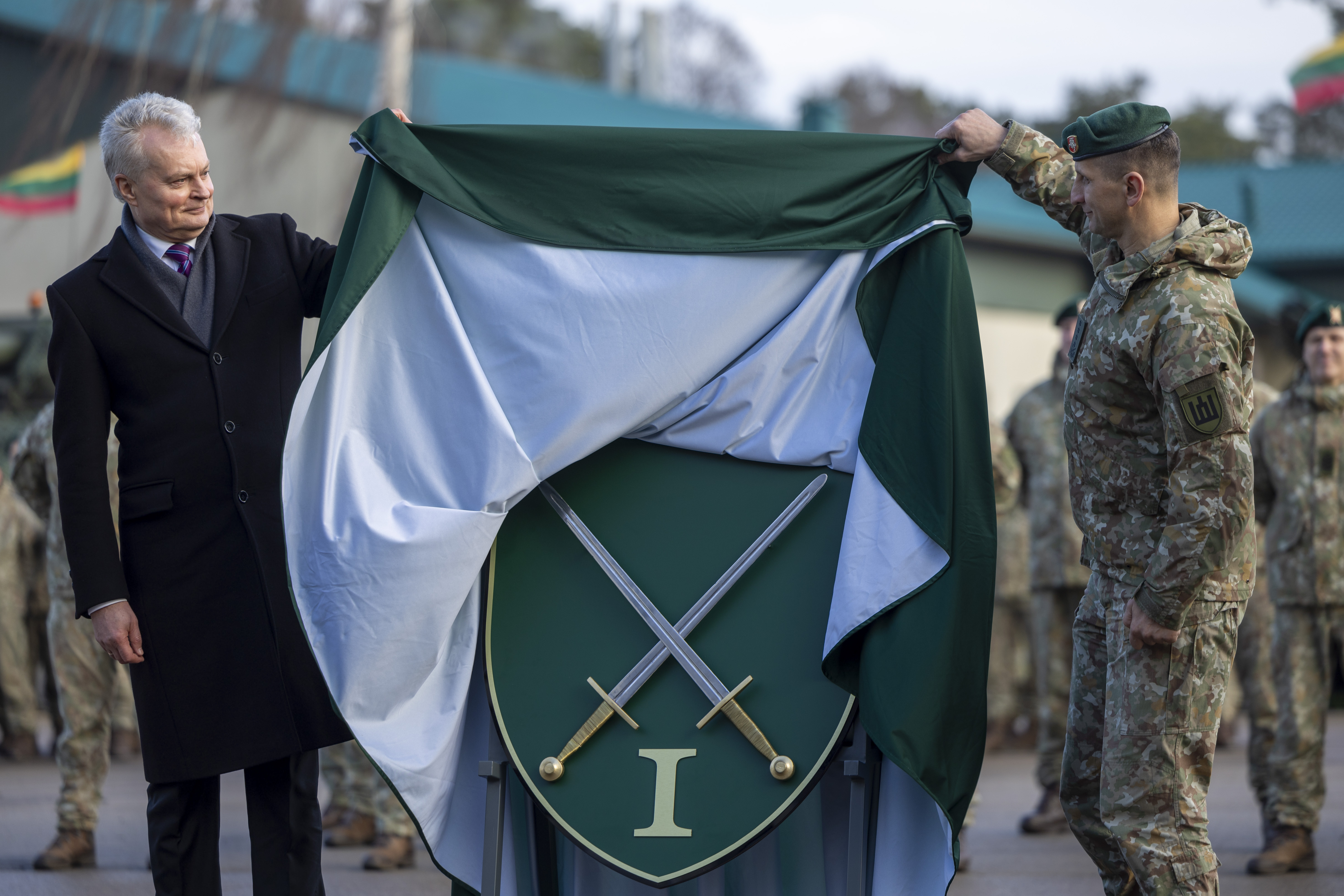
Lithuanian 1st Division was restored in 2025. The country has significantly increased its defence spending in 2024–2026.

Between 2010 and 2014, Lithuanian military spending declined to less than 1% of national GDP, and the country abolished conscription from 2008 to 2015, leading to increased dependence on NATO. Close proximity of the Russo-Ukrainian war to the Baltic states led to the country increasing its defence spending to 2.8% of national GDP in 2024, while simultaneously developing new domestic production and maintenance capabilities to reduce supply chain vulnerabilities.

In June 2024, Lithuania signed a landmark $200 million investment agreement with German arms manufacturer Rheinmetall to establish an ammunition production facility. The plant, designated as a project of "state importance", received expedited administrative procedures and was designed to produce NATO-standard 155mm artillery shells. Production was scheduled to commence by late 2025.

Since the Russian invasion of Ukraine in 2022, Lithuania acquired or ordered significant quantities of modern military equipment, including new tanks, infantry fighting vehicles, artillery and air defense systems. In 2026, NATO estimated that Lithuania was spending 5.33% of national GDP on defence – the highest percentage in the NATO alliance.

=== The Netherlands ===
Dutch finance minister Eelco Heinen advocated for compensating increased defence spending through budget cuts in other areas besides through additional common debt issuance.

=== Poland ===
In May 2024, Polish foreign minister Radosław Sikorski advocated for substantial increases in European defence spending, setting an example by allocating 4% of the nation's GDP to defence. Sikorski also supported several initiatives for enhanced European military cooperation, including the establishment of a 5,000-strong EU mechanised brigade, as well as incorporation of the United Kingdom and Ukraine into existing European defence structures. Sikorski spoke against the earlier "deindustrialisation" of European defence capabilities.

In February 2025, Poland was Europe's leading defence spender, allocating 4.7% of its GDP to military expenditure and significantly exceeding NATO's target threshold. Prime Minister of Poland Donald Tusk emphasised maintaining strong U.S.-European relations while advocating for increased European defence capabilities, in contrast with statements from other European leaders urging for greater defence autonomy away from the United States. Tusk diverted from French president Emmanuel Macron's desire to send national troops into Ukraine for combat, instead recommending logistical support. Sikorski recommended the creation of an "investment bank" so the European Union could push back against Russian aggression.

=== Romania ===
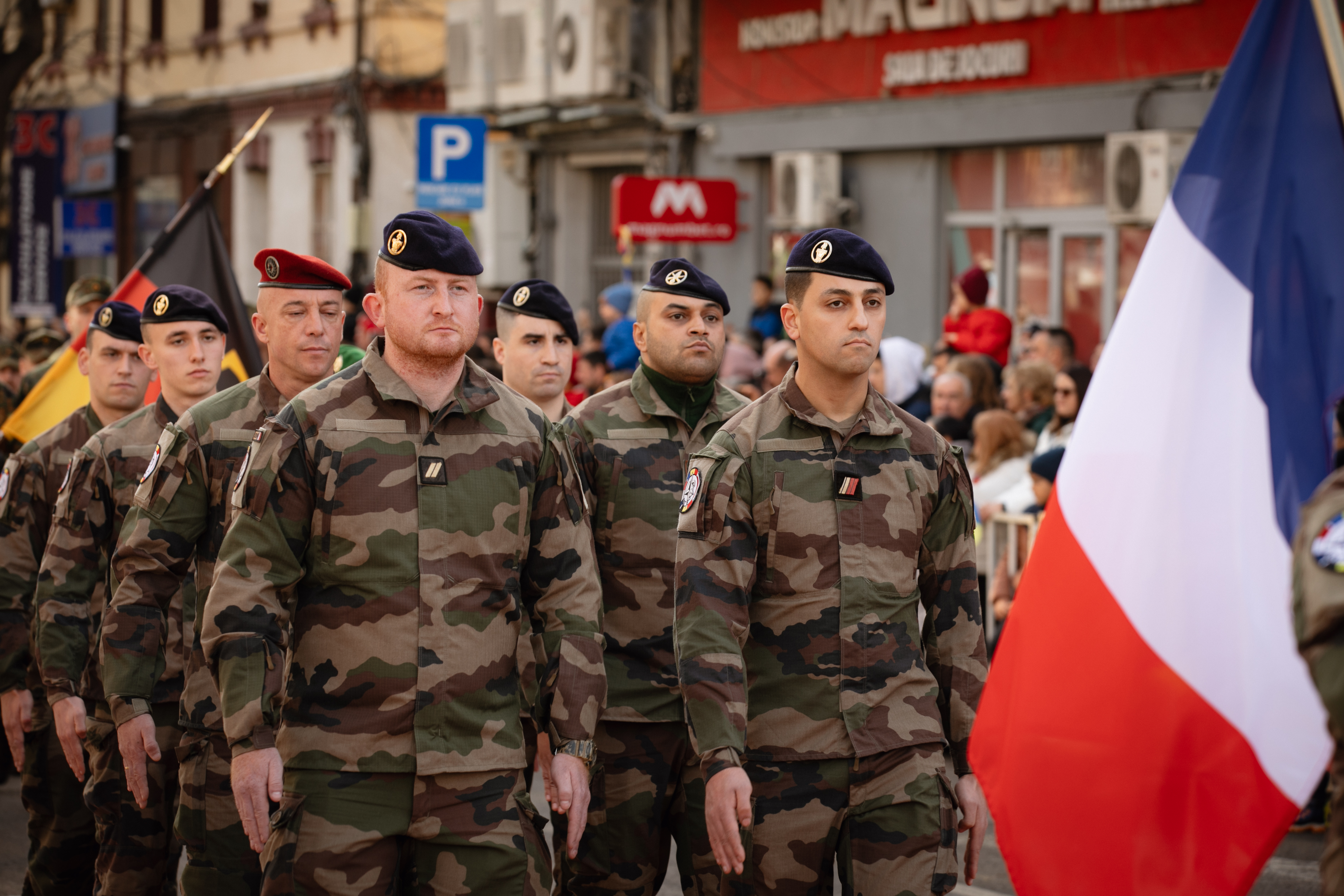
French Armed Forces march in Romania's National Day parade, 2023

On 3 June 2025, Romania’s President Nicușor Dan announced his intention to significantly increase the country’s military spending. He proposed allocating 3.5% of GDP to what he described as “effective military spending” and an additional 1.5% to related expenditures by 2032. This announcement came alongside major defence projects, including the €2.5 billion modernisation of the Mihai Kogălniceanu Air Base near the Black Sea. Scheduled for completion by 2040, and supported by an expected €400 million contribution from the European Commission, the base is planned to host up to 10,000 permanent troops, with capacity for an additional 10,000 on a temporary basis. Work has already begun to expand the facility, which is set to become NATO’s largest military base in Europe.

The EU plans to establish a Black Sea maritime security hub in Romania to protect critical infrastructure, monitor undersea cables and offshore facilities, and enhance NATO–EU defence coordination amid Russia’s war in Ukraine.

In August 2025, Romania and the German arms manufacturer Rheinmetall agreed to build a €535 million gunpowder plant in Romania, with construction due to start in 2026. The facility will supply both domestic and European defence needs.

=== Spain ===
In February 2025, Spanish economy minister Carlos Cuerpo proposed expanding the EU's common debt mechanisms to finance defence spending. He suggested that increased defence expenditure be treated as a "public good" and logical extension of the €650 billion Next Generation EU post-COVID recovery programme. At the time, Spain maintained the lowest defence spending ratio among NATO countries at 1.28% of GDP, though it committed to reaching the NATO target of 2% by 2029.

=== Sweden ===
In September 2024, Swedish defence minister Pål Jonson announced plans to increase defence spending by 13 billion SEK for 2025, corresponding to 2.4% of the GDP compared to the previous year's 2.2%. The plan is to increase to 2.8% of the GDP by 2028.

=== United Kingdom ===
In February 2025, British prime minister Keir Starmer announced plans to increase defence spending to 2.5% of the country's GDP by 2027, up from 2.3%, by cutting spending on foreign aid. An ambition of 3% of GDP has been set in the next Parliament, however, this is not a legally binding commitment. In June 2025, British prime minister Keir Starmer's government published the Strategic Defence Review (2025), which announced an extra £15 billion of investment into the Astraea nuclear warhead programme, and £6 billion in munitions this parliamentary term, including £1.5 billion in an "always on" pipeline for munitions. Additionally, plans have been made to produce up to 12 SSN-AUKUS submarines in the latter 2030s. The plan also commits Britain to continuous submarine production, aiming to launch a new submarine roughly every 18 months. Other sections of the SDR include Government commitments to procuring 7,000 domestic long range weapons, technological upgrades and homeland air defence.

Additionally in June 2025, at the NATO summit in The Hague, NATO agreed to spend 3.5% of GDP on core defence, 1.5% on wider security spending, leading to a total of 5% of GDP by 2035. The UK has supported this.

In June 2026, the Ministry of Defence announced the Defence Investment Plan, which aims to deliver on the terms of the SDR. The DIP set out a path where British defence spending will reach 2.7% from 2027/8 onwards, which has gone beyond Starmer's pledge in 2025. Additionally, the government maintained its ambition to reach 3% of GDP on defence during the next Parliament.

The DIP also announced £290 billion of defence spending, to be delivered over 4 years, an additional £15 billion investment package, and an MoD budget reaching approximately £79 billion per year by 2029/30.

Other points stated include:

- £5 billion towards expendable drones, autonomous surveillance, AI targeting and other systems
- The Government has continued investment in the Global Combat Air Programme (GCAP), intended to replace the Eurofighter Typhoon in British service from 2035
- Plans to procure 12 F-35A aircraft have been confirmed
- A continuation of the increased weapon production policy from the SDR.

In the October 2026 Government Budget, the government confirmed full funding for the DIP's spending, closing a £4.7 billion gap in funding. This will take the defence spending to its stated goal of 2.7% in 2027/8. Additionally, the budget has set a date of 2030 for defence spending to reach 3%. The budget also funded £10 billion of additional economic and military support for Ukraine, including £500 million for emergency funding this winter. This sits alongside the already promised £3 billion per year.

== Economic limits ==
The rearmament effort faced several significant challenges. Due to Europe's prior deindustrialisation, especially in military sectors, defence contractors struggled with capacity constraints amid increased demand for arming Ukraine. This limited their ability to produce sufficient quantities of military equipment, such as tanks, artillery shells, and fighter jets. European defence ministers and industry leaders consistently highlighted the challenge of absorption capacity— the ability of defence industries to effectively utilise increased funding.

Large-scale defence spending in 2022 prompted concerns about resurgent inflation in Europe.

Many European nations grappled with budgetary limitations and competing priorities regarding social programs. For instance, France's defence budget of ~€50.5 billion (just above 2% of national GDP) would require an additional €30 billion every year to reach 3% of GDP that would be difficult to allocate amid existing budget deficits and EU fiscal rules.

The rearmament trend prompted significant debate about the balance between defence spending and social welfare programs. While some leaders, including NATO Secretary-General Rutte, advocated for redirecting a portion of social spending toward defence, this proposition met resistance from many European governments. Credit rating agency Moody's estimated that increasing defence spending to 4% of GDP would require up to a 6% reallocation of public spending in Europe's six largest economies.

Economists have warned that Friedrich Merz's plan to massively increase defence spending in Germany could trigger inflation and increase Germany's government debt. Germany would pay approximately €71 billion in interest annually from 2035.

== Foreign reactions ==
During a trip to Warsaw during February 2025, U.S. Secretary of Defense Pete Hegseth praised the United States's alliance with Poland, stating that the nation was "leading by example" in terms of defence spending relative to other NATO members.

Several reporters noted that European Defence Industrial Strategy proposals needed to be approved by the European Parliament and by all twenty-seven member states of the EU, including Ireland, which as noted by Euronews, remains neutral. Royal Military School teacher and Université catholique de Louvain researcher Alain De Neve said it was clear that von der Leyen had not embarked on a war economy. Vice President of the European Commission Margrethe Vestager acknowledged that the programme allocated "not a lot of money when it comes to the defence industry".

Geopolitical author and journalist George Monbiot believed that potential changes to U.S. foreign policy away from Europe and NATO should prompt the United Kingdom nations to reconsider their defence postures towards independent militarisation and nuclear armament. Swedish security expert Elisabeth Braw advocated for an increase in explosive experts to train military compatriots.

== See also ==
- German rearmament
- West German rearmament
- British rearmament before World War II
- European Sky Shield Initiative
- List of countries in Europe by military expenditures
