= Food miles =

Distance food is transported from production to consumption

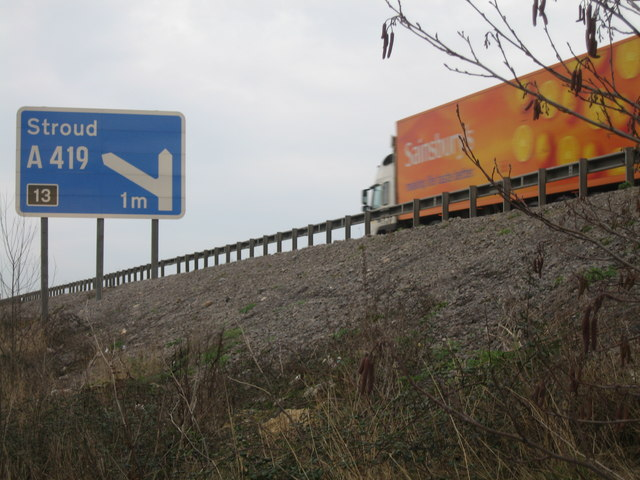
A truck carrying produce

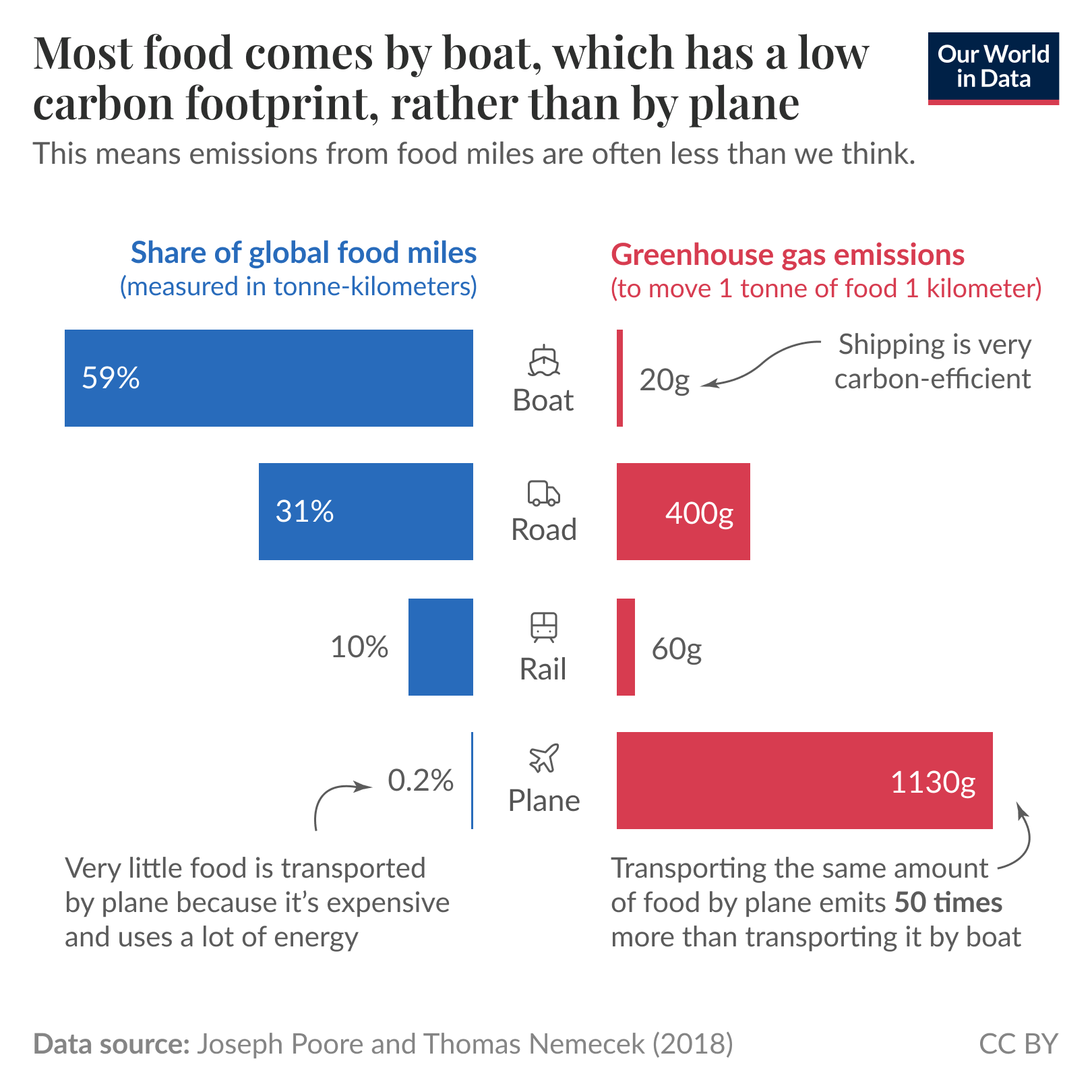
Share of food miles by transportation mode and it's environmental impact

Food miles is the distance food is transported from the time of its making until it reaches the consumer. Food miles are one factor used when testing the environmental impact of food, such as the carbon footprint of the food.

The concept of food miles originated in the early 1990s in the United Kingdom. It was conceived by Professor Tim Lang at the Sustainable Agriculture Food and Environment (SAFE) Alliance and first appeared in print in a report, "The Food Miles Report: The Dangers of Long-Distance Food Transport", researched and written by Angela Paxton.

Some scholars believe that an increase in the distance food travels is due to the globalization of trade; the focus of food supply bases into fewer, larger districts; drastic changes in delivery patterns; the increase in processed and packaged foods; and making fewer trips to the supermarket. A 2022 global analysis that included transportation throughout upstream food supply chains estimated food-miles emissions at about 3.0 billion tonnes of carbon-dioxide equivalent, approximately 19% of combined food-system emissions from transport, production and land-use change.

Several studies compare emissions over the entire food cycle, including production, consumption, and transport. These include estimates of food-related emissions of greenhouse gas 'up to the farm gate' versus 'beyond the farm gate'. In the UK, for example, agricultural-related emissions may account for approximately 40% of the overall food chain (including retail, packaging, fertilizer manufacture, and other factors), whereas greenhouse gases emitted in transport account for around 12% of overall food-chain emissions.

Global food miles CO_{2} emissions are 3.5–7.5 times higher than previously estimated, with transport accounting for about 19% of total emissions from the food system, albeit shifting towards plant-based diets remains substantially more important.

The concept of "food miles" has been criticised, and food miles are not always correlated with the actual environmental impact of food production. In comparison, the percentage of total energy used in home food preparation is 26% and in food processing is 29%, far greater than transportation.

== Overview ==
The concept of food miles is part of the broader issue of sustainability which deals with a large range of environmental, social and economic issues, including local food. The term was coined by Tim Lang (now Professor of Food Policy, City University, London) who says: "The point was to highlight the hidden ecological, social and economic consequences of food production to consumers in a simple way, one which had objective reality but also connotations." The increased distance traveled by food in developed countries was caused by the globalization of food trade, which increased by four times since 1961. Food that is transported by road produces more carbon emissions than any other form of transported food. The environmental impact of food transport depends on both distance and transport mode. Shipping accounts for a large share of global food freight but has substantially lower emissions per tonne-kilometre than road or air transport. Air freight represents only a small share of global food transport, but has a comparatively high emissions intensity.

Although it was never intended as a complete measure of environmental impact, it has come under attack as an ineffective means of finding the true environmental impact. For example, a DEFRA report in 2005 undertaken by researchers at AEA Technology Environment, entitled The Validity of Food Miles as an Indicator of Sustainable Development, included findings that "the direct environmental, social and economic costs of food transport are over £9 billion each year, and are dominated by congestion." The report also indicates that it is not only how far the food has travelled but the method of travel in all parts of the food chain that is important to consider. Many trips by personal cars to shopping centres would have a negative environmental impact compared to transporting a few truckloads to neighbourhood stores that can be easily reached by walking or cycling. More emissions are created by the drive to the supermarket to buy air freighted food than was created by the air freighting in the first place. Also, the positive environmental effects of organic farming may be compromised by increased transportation, unless it is produced by local farms. The Carbon Trust notes that to understand the carbon emissions from food production, all the carbon-emitting processes that occur as a result of getting food from the field to our plates need to be considered, including production, origin, seasonality and home care.

== Food miles in business ==
A 2010 study led by Professor Miguel Gomez (Applied Economics and Management), at Cornell University and supported by the Atkinson Center for a Sustainable Future found that in many instances, the supermarket supply chain did much better in terms of food miles and fuel consumption for each pound compared to farmers markets. It suggests that selling local foods through supermarkets may be more economically viable and sustainable than through farmers markets.

Shorter food supply chains do not necessarily produce lower transport emissions per unit of food. Consolidation, vehicle capacity, distribution efficiency and the number of intermediaries can influence environmental performance, meaning that centralized retail distribution may in some cases be more transport-efficient than small-scale direct distribution.

== Calculating food miles ==
With processed foods that are made of many different ingredients, it is very complicated, though not impossible, to calculate the CO_{2} emissions from transport by multiplying the distance travelled of each ingredient, by the carbon intensity of the mode of transport (air, road or rail). However, as both Tim Lang and the original Food Miles report noted, the resulting number, although interesting, cannot give the whole picture of how sustainable – or not – a food product is.

Wal-Mart publicized a press releasing that stated food travelled 1,500 miles (2,400 km) before it reaches customers. The statistics aroused public concern about food miles. According to Jane Black, a food writer who covers food politics, the number was derived from a small database. The 22 terminal markets from which the data was collected handled 30% of the United States produce.

Some iOS and Android apps allow consumers to get information about food products, including nutritional information, product origin, and the distance the product travelled from its production location to the consumer. Such apps include OpenLabel, Glow, and Open Food Facts. These apps may rely on barcode scanning. Also, smartphones can scan a product's QR code, after which the browser opens up showing the production location of the product (i.e. Farm to Fork project, ...).

== Criticism ==
=== Fair trade ===
According to Oxfam researchers, there are many other aspects of the agricultural processing and the food supply chain that also contribute to greenhouse gas emissions which are not taken into account by simple "food miles" measurements. There are benefits to be gained by improving livelihoods in poor countries through agricultural development. Smallholder farmers in poor countries can often improve their income and standard of living if they can sell to distant export markets for higher value horticultural produce, moving away from the subsistence agriculture of producing staple crops for their own consumption or local markets.

However, exports from poor countries do not always benefit poor people. Unless the product has a Fairtrade certification label, or a label from another robust and independent scheme, food exports might make a bad situation worse. Only a very small percentage of what importers pay will end up in the hands of plantation workers. Wages are often very low and working conditions bad and sometimes dangerous. Sometimes the food grown for export takes up land that had been used to grow food for local consumption, so local people can go hungry.

=== Energy used in production as well as transport ===
Researchers say a more complete environmental assessment of food that consumers buy needs to take into account how the food has been produced and what energy is used in its production. A recent Department for Environment, Food and Rural Affairs (DEFRA) case study indicated that tomatoes grown in Spain and transported to the United Kingdom may have a lower carbon footprint in terms of energy than heated greenhouses in the United Kingdom.

According to German researchers, the food miles concept misleads consumers because the size of transportation and production units is not taken into account. Using the methodology of Life Cycle Assessment (LCA) in accordance with ISO 14040, entire supply chains providing German consumers with food were investigated, comparing local food with food of European and global provenance. Large-scale agriculture reduces unit costs associated with food production and transportation, leading to increased efficiency and decreased energy use per kilogram of food by economies of scale. Research from the Justus Liebig University Giessen show that small food production operations may cause even more environmental impact than bigger operations in terms of energy use per kilogram, even though food miles are lower. Case studies of lamb, beef, wine, apples, fruit juices and pork show that the concept of food miles is too simple to account for all factors of food production.

A 2006 research report from the Agribusiness and Economics Research Unit at Lincoln University, New Zealand counters claims about food miles by comparing total energy used in food production in Europe and New Zealand, taking into account energy used to ship the food to Europe for consumers. The report states, "New Zealand has greater production efficiency in many food commodities compared to the UK. For example New Zealand agriculture tends to apply fewer fertilizers (which require large amounts of energy to produce and cause significant CO_{2} emissions) and animals are able to graze year round outside eating grass instead of large quantities of brought-in feed such as concentrates. In the case of dairy and sheep meat production NZ is by far more energy efficient, even including the transport cost, than the UK, twice as efficient in the case of dairy, and four times as efficient in case of sheep meat. In the case of apples, NZ is more energy-efficient even though the energy embodied in capital items and other inputs data was not available for the UK."

Other researchers have contested the claims from New Zealand. Professor Gareth Edwards-Jones has said that the arguments "in favour of New Zealand apples shipped to the UK is probably true only or about two months a year, during July and August, when the carbon footprint for locally grown fruit doubles because it comes out of cool stores."

Studies by Dr. Christopher Weber et al. of the total carbon footprint of food production in the U.S. have shown transportation to be of minor importance, compared to the carbon emissions resulting from pesticide and fertilizer production, and the fuel required by farm and food processing equipment.

=== Livestock production as a source of greenhouse gases ===
Farm animals account for between 20% and 30% of global greenhouse gas (GHG) emissions. That figure includes the clearing of land to feed and graze the animals. Clearing land of trees, and cultivation, are the main drivers of farming emissions. Deforestation eliminates carbon sinks, accelerating the process of climate change. Cultivation, including the use of synthetic fertilisers, releases greenhouse gases such as nitrous oxide. Nitrogen fertiliser is especially demanding of fossil fuels, as producing a tonne of it takes 1.5 tonnes of oil.

Meanwhile, it is increasingly recognised that meat and dairy are the largest sources of food-related emissions. The UK's consumption of meat and dairy products (including imports) accounts for about 8% of national greenhouse gas emissions related to consumption.

According to a study by engineers Christopher Weber and H. Scott Matthews of Carnegie Mellon University, of all the greenhouse gases emitted by the food industry, only 4% comes from transporting the food from producers to retailers. The study also concluded that adopting a vegetarian diet, even if the vegetarian food is transported over very long distances, does far more to reduce greenhouse gas emissions than does eating a locally grown diet. They also concluded that "Shifting less than one day per week's worth of calories from red meat and dairy products to chicken, fish, eggs, or a vegetable-based diet achieves more GHG reduction than buying all locally sourced food." In other words, the amount of red meat consumption is much more important than food miles.

=== "Local" food miles ===
A commonly ignored element is the last mile. For example, a gallon of gasoline could transport 5 kg of meat over 60,000 miles (97,000 km) by road (40 tonner at 8 mpg) in bulk transport, or it could transport a single consumer only 30 or 40 miles (64 km) to buy that meat. Thus foods from a distant farm that are transported in bulk to a nearby store consumer can have a lower footprint than foods a consumer picks up directly from a farm that is within driving distance but farther away than the store. This can mean that doorstep deliveries of food by companies can lead to lower carbon emissions or energy use than normal shopping practices. Relative distances and mode of transportation make this calculation complicated. For example, consumers can significantly reduce the carbon footprint of the last mile by walking, bicycling, or taking public transport. Another impact is that goods being transported by large ships very long distances can have lower associated carbon emissions or energy use than the same goods traveling by truck a much shorter distance.

=== Lifecycle analysis, rather than food miles ===
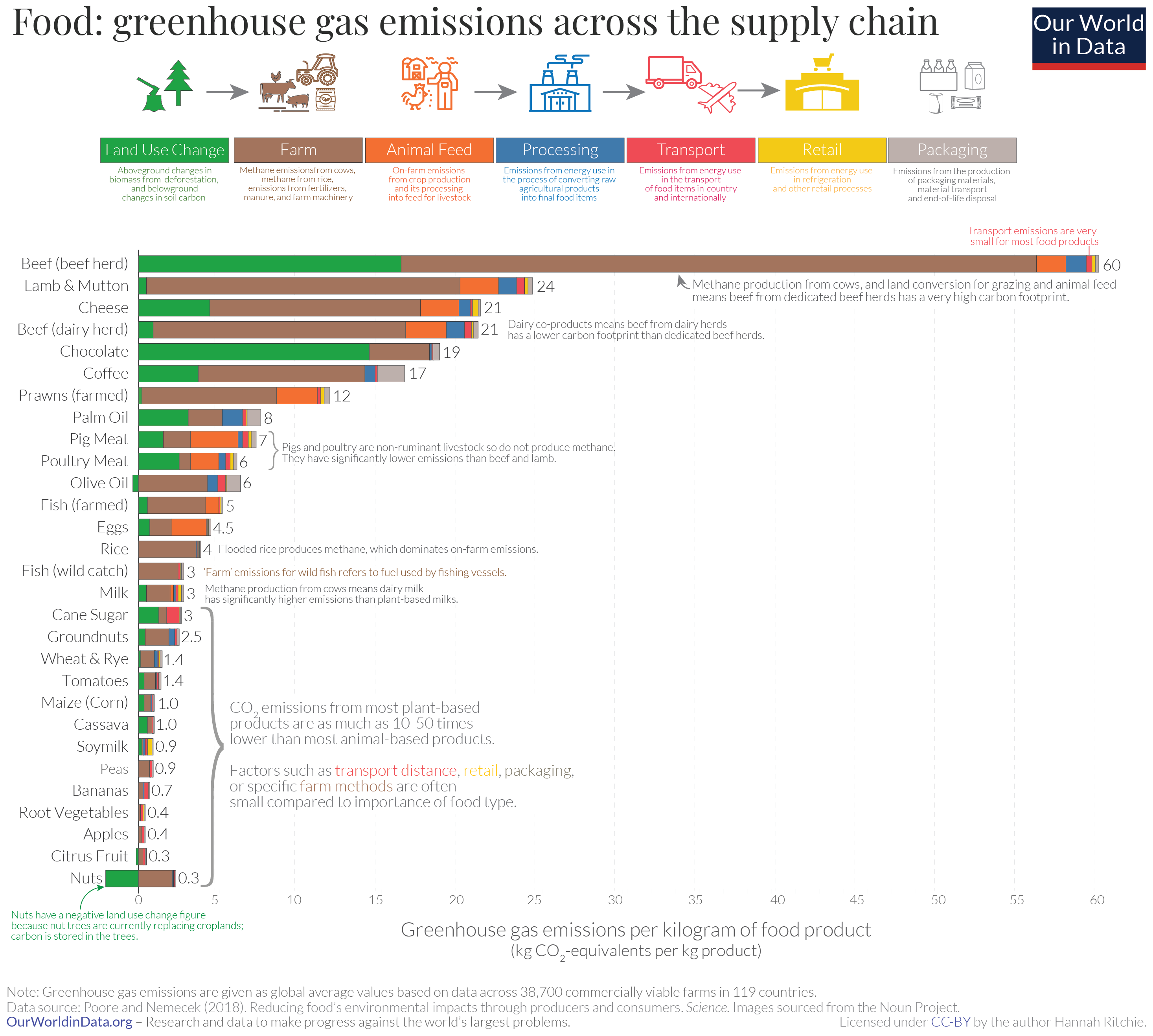
Transport (in red) is only a very small share in food GHG emissions.

Lifecycle analysis, a technique that meshes together a wide range of different environmental criteria including emissions and waste, is a more holistic way of assessing the real environmental impact of the food we eat. The technique accounts for energy input and output involved in the production, processing, packaging and transport of food. It also factors in resource depletion, air pollution and water pollution and waste generation/municipal solid waste.

A number of organisations are developing ways of calculating the carbon cost or lifecycle impact of food and agriculture. However, these methodologies vary in rigor, and there is no standardised framework to distinguish between thorough, independent and reliable assessments, and promotional marketing claims.

Even a full lifecycle analysis accounts only for the environmental effects of food production and consumption. However, it is one of the widely agreed three pillars of sustainable development, namely environmental, social and economic.

== See also ==
- Sustainable food system#Local food systems
