= Edip =

Edip is a Turkish given name.

== People named Edip ==
- Halide Edip Adıvar (1884–1964), Turkish novelist and feminist
- Edip Akbayram (1950–2025), Turkish musician
- Edip Cansever (1928–1986), Turkish poet
- Edip Yüksel (born 1957), Turkish American intellectual

== See also ==
- European Defence Industry Programme (EDIP)
