= The Game Changers =

2018 American documentary film

- Release poster
- Directed by: Louie Psihoyos
- Written by: Mark Monroe; Joseph Pace
- Produced by: Joseph Pace; James Wilks
- Starring: James Wilks; Scott Jurek; Patrik Baboumian
- Production companies: Oceanic Preservation Society; Refuel Productions; Diamond Docs; The Djinn Foundation
- Release date: January 19, 2018
- Running time: 86 minutes
- Country: United States
- Language: English
- Box office: $897,992

The Game Changers is a 2018 American documentary film about vegan athletes who follow whole-food, plant-based diets.

== Release ==
The Game Changers debuted at the Sundance Film Festival in January 2018, with a second edit released worldwide for a one-day screening in September 2019. The film has over a dozen executive producers, including James Cameron, Arnold Schwarzenegger, Pamela Anderson, Steve Bellamy, Rip Esselstyn, Jackie Chan and Brendan Brazier.

== Synopsis ==
James Wilks is a mixed martial artist and self defense instructor. Having suffered an injury he used his downtime to explore the effects of plant-based diets on health, recovery, and athletic performance. He first explores the vegetarian diet of Roman gladiators before interviewing athletes such as Scott Jurek, Patrik Baboumian, Bryant Jennings, and Derrick Morgan (along with his wife, the plant-based chef Charity Morgan) who attribute their success to a plant-based diet.

Comments follow from Scott Stoll, a physician for the USA Olympic team, who argues that animal based protein impedes recovery and athletic performance due to certain inflammatory molecules and inflammatory mediators. He contrasts this with plant-based proteins that, he argues, promote gut microbial diversity, reduce inflammation, and optimize recovery and athletic performance. The film dramatizes a comparison of postprandial effects of meals consisting of animal- versus plant-based foods, purporting to show that those who ate meat showed reduced penile function and indications of endothelial dysfunction that could disrupt athletic performance. In an interview, Professor of Epidemiology and Nutrition, Walter Willett, argues that there is accumulating evidence showing that high consumption of protein from dairy sources is related to a higher risk of prostate cancer.

The next scenes criticize the meat and dairy industry for what Perry Mason, Executive Officer of the Cook County Department of Public Health, calls tactics out of the tobacco industry playbook where public relations firms such as Exponent hire researchers to create doubt to counteract public health messages. Doctor of preventative medicine David Katz says despite the appearance of confusion in the media, there is global consensus that a healthy diet is a plant-food rich diet.

A further indictment of animal agriculture comes from Bob Bailey, Research Director of Energy, Environment, and Resources at Chatham House, who says that while three quarters of all agricultural land are used for livestock production such food sources provide 34% of the protein and 18% of the calories worldwide. Animal agriculture is charged with being a main driver of deforestation and is implicated in habitat destruction and loss of biodiversity. Other scientists in the film mention other environmental impacts of animal farming including carbon dioxide emissions, the overuse of fresh water, and water pollution. Professor of Food Policy, Tim Lang, makes a closing argument that reducing meat and dairy consumption and increasing plant consumption will improve both public health and environmental health.

Having recovered from his injury, Wilks is shown teaching self defense with an additional component, what he terms "internal defense", saying that with his understanding of the benefits of plant-based diets he now has the tools to protect more lives than ever before.

== Notable individuals featured ==
In order of appearance

- James Wilks
- Scott Jurek
- Morgan Mitchell
- Dotsie Bausch
- Kendrick Farris
- Patrik Baboumian
- Bryant Jennings
- Michael Thomas
- Griff Whalen
- Kenny Stills
- Caldwell Esselstyn
- Dean Ornish
- Kim Williams
- Rip Esselstyn
- Lucious Smith
- Arnold Schwarzenegger
- Walter Willett
- Richard Wrangham
- Christina Warinner
- Mark Thomas
- Charity Morgan
- Derrick Morgan
- Jurrell Casey
- Brian Orakpo
- Tye Smith
- Wesley Woodyard
- DaQuan Jones
- Rishard Matthews
- David Katz
- Damien Mander
- Johan Rockström
- Tim Lang
- Lewis Hamilton
- Virat Kohli

== Reception ==
On Rotten Tomatoes the film has an approval rating of 67% based on reviews from 9 critics. It received overall positive reviews by viewers, but was criticized by some nutrition, fitness, and science communication professionals. It has been credited with influencing some viewers to shift their dietary habits towards more plant-based options, an impact that has been dubbed the "Game Changers effect". Actor Dolph Lundgren and CEO of Greggs, Roger Whiteside said they decided to follow a vegan diet after watching it.

VegNews ranked the film as one of the best vegan documentaries to watch in 2024. Viewing the film is accredited as an approved activity for continuing medical education (CME) credits by the Defense Health Agency, and the American College of Lifestyle Medicine offers CME credits for watching the film and passing an online quiz based on it.

The documentary was criticized by some professionals in fitness, nutrition, and science communication. For example, sports nutrition expert Asker Jeukendrup said, "Game Changers ticks almost all the boxes of pseudoscience, and none of the boxes of science" while Joe Schwarcz, director of the McGill University Office for Science and Society complained, "There is good science to be had for promoting a plant-based diet, but this film strays too much into pseudoscience for my appetite." Schwarcz criticized the film, saying "the feats of the athletes in The Game Changers cannot be considered to be proof of the benefits of a vegan diet for athletic performance." According to Schwarcz, the evidence presented "is quite flimsy", the filmmakers indulge in confirmation bias and data dredging, and "some of the research cited on behalf of veganism is funded by the organic or avocado industries."

The journal of the Hungarian Dietetic Association Új DIÉTA (New Diet) criticized the film, calling it "pseudoscience rather than real science" and "propaganda for veganism". The journal criticized the film for "one-sided research" and claims lacking in scientific basis, saying "The Game Changers only includes research that is conducive to the message they want to convey, that a vegan (plant based) diet is better in all respects than a diet containing animal-derived foods." The journal opined that it is "of paramount importance" that a documentary of this type approach the topic with scientific rigor, but "instead, the filmmakers placed more emphasis (on) eliciting emotional impact than the proper scientific background." Mail & Guardian writer Luke Feltham similarly criticized the documentarian's claims of neutral presentation of facts, calling the film "an hour-and-a-half advertisement for vegan living".

Some generally supportive reviewers also took issue with the movie's portrayal of masculinity especially as it adopts some stereotypical arguments regarding virility and the traditionally assumed connections between masculinity and strength.

== Future ==
In January 2026, Cameron announced he is producing a sequel, stating it "is about plant-based athletes".

== See also ==
- List of vegan and plant-based media
