= National Preparedness Commission =

UK think tank

The National Preparedness Commission (NPC) is an independent, not-for-profit, non-political organisation in the United Kingdom. The Commission was set up to promote better preparedness against national crises, threats and incidents. Its work focuses on how the UK can better prevent, mitigate, respond to and recover from disruptive events affecting society, the economy and critical national infrastructure.

Established in 2020, the Commission produces research and policy papers on national preparedness, resilience, and responses to major risks and crises. The Commission also submits written evidence to Parliament, and its members have given oral evidence to several Parliamentary Committees.

The Commission is chaired by Lord Toby Harris of Haringey. The Commission depends on support from sponsors, some of whom work with the Commission as partners.

== Governance ==
The Chair of the Commission is Lord Toby Harris of Haringey. The Vice Chairs are Sir Ian Andrews, CBE TD, Sir Ken Olisa OBE CStJ FRSA FBCS and Professor Brian Collins CB FREng.

The Commission is made up of around 50 Commissioners drawn from public life, academia, business and civil society. These Commissioners oversee and guide the Commission’s work.

Commissioners include:

- Rebecca Lawrence
- John Armitt CBE FrEng
- Victor Adebowale, The Lord Adebowale CBE
- James Arbuthnot, The Lord Arbuthnot of Edrom PC
- Elisabeth Braw
- John Barradell OBE
- Sir David Omand GCB
- Gisela Abbam FRSA
- Ingrid Stephanie Boyce CBE FKC DL
- Sir Ian Trevelyan Chapman FREng FRS FInstP
- Dame Jo da Silva DBE FREng FICE RDI
- Dame Cressida Dick
- Ruth Kelly
- Sir David Lidington KCB CBE
- Michael Mainelli KStJ OMRI
- Bruce Mann CB
- Professor Ciaran Martin CB
- Dame Sarah Mullally DBE
- Martin Rees, The Lord Rees of Ludlow, OM FRS HonFREng FMedSci FRAS HonFInstP
- John Reid PC
- Basil Scarsella
- Admiral Rt Hon Lord Alan West of Spithead GCB DSC PC

== Objectives ==
The Commission promotes policies and actions to help the UK be better prepared to avoid, mitigate, respond to, and recover from major shocks, threats and challenges. It advocates a whole-of-society, threat agnostic, and ‘systems thinking’ approach to national preparedness.

The ‘Whole of Society’ approach, advocated by the Commission, stresses that every level of society, including government, organisations, and communities, should be enabled to contribute to the better preparedness of the country as a whole.‘Systems Thinking’ considers that all systems, such as critical national infrastructure, are linked and that a threat and crisis in one can cascade and affect others.

== Publications ==
The Commission publishes reports and reviews on national emergency preparedness and systemic risks affecting the United Kingdom. Reports have been cited in newspapers, magazines, journals, as well as used as part of evidence to Parliament and featured in Government policy papers.

The reports published by the National Preparedness Commission cover topics such as:

- Health and healthcare.
- Geopolitical impacts on food and supply chain security.
- Cyber and technology risk, including malicious AI and ML.
- Critical infrastructure, utilities and their interconnectedness.
- National resilience and the Civil Contingencies Act.

In December 2021, the National Preparedness Commission published a report written by Dr Carina Fearnley and Professor Ilan Kelman entitled “Enhanced Warnings”. The report assessed the national alert system used by the UK Government during the COVID-19 Pandemic.

In March 2022, the commission published an independent review of the UK Civil Contingencies Act 2004. The review was led by Bruce Mann, former Director of Civil Contingencies Secretariat.

In February 2024, the commission published a report on food security, specifically civil resilience in protecting the UK food supply. The lead author of the report was Tim Lang, Professor Emeritus of Food Policy at City St George's, University of London.

In July 2025, the UK Government published its Resilience Action Plan, which cited several of the National Preparedness Commission’s reports as evidence.

In August 2025, the commission published a report on energy security and infrastructure, entitled “Assessing Energy Resilience in the UK 2050”.

In 2025, the National Preparedness Commission updated its “Strategic Issues” paper, originally published in 2020. The original report was written in October 2020 by Professor Brian Collins, a Vice-Chair of the Commission. The updated version, “The New Strategic Issues”, was cited by the House of Lords Library, which highlighted its analysis of emerging risks.

In 2025, the Society of Chemical Industry and National Preparedness Commission published a report which explored the resilience of the UK Industrial Base.

In 2026, the National Preparedness Commission published a report written by Elisabeth Braw titled “The Reserve Potential: What the UK Can Learn from Top-Performing Allies”.

== Engagement with Parliament ==
The National Preparedness Commission draws on the work of its commissioners to submit written and oral evidence on national resilience to Parliament.

Contributions from the National Preparedness Commissions have typically recognised the world as being “turbulent, uncertain, novel and ambiguous” and stressed the need for greater wholesale resilience. In evidence to committees, Commissioners from the have emphasised the need for greater ambition in the Government’s approach to national preparedness, the need for wider and more proactive public engagement and called for resilience and preparedness to be a “fundamental organising principle of all government activity”.
