= Charity Morgan =

American plant-based chef

- Education: Le Cordon Bleu College of Culinary Arts (Pasadena, California branch)
- Occupations: Plant-based chef, cookbook author, television host
- Spouse: Derrick Morgan
- Writing career
- Genres: Cookbook and Television
- Notable works: Unbelievably Vegan: 100+ Life-Changing, Plant-Based Recipes: A Cookbook (2022); Unbelievably Vegan with Chef Charity (2024)
- Website: charitymorgan.com

Chef Charity Morgan is an American plant-based chef, cookbook author, and television host. She is married to former NFL Linebacker Derrick Morgan, appeared with him in the 2018 plant-based diet documentary, The Game Changers, and is the host of Unbelievably Vegan with Chef Charity on Max.

== Early life and education ==
Morgan grew up on a farm near Sacramento, California. Her culinary interests began as a child, when she was influenced by the dishes from her "mother's Puerto Rican heritage," and Creole dishes made by her paternal grandmother. Her mother's cooking was also influenced by friends from the Philippines, Mexico, and India. In addition, her eventual shift away from animal products was partially the result of watching animals killed for food on her family's farm.

She is a graduate of the Pasadena, California branch of Le Cordon Bleu College of Culinary Arts.

== Career ==
After an externship through Le Cordon Bleu with a "very high-end restaurant off Melrose," in Los Angeles, Morgan worked as a chef for a few restaurants and catering companies, before becoming a private chef for people who can't cook.

Although Morgan and her husband former NFL Linebacker Derrick Morgan tried going plant-based in 2015, they did not succeed. A few years later in 2017, Derrick tried again after meeting with a nutritionist in order to improve his athletic performance. However, as he didn't like the food that was part of that program, Charity decided to become a plant-based chef in order to prepare his meals. After helping Derrick transition to a fully plant-based diet, Charity then convinced several other Tennessee Titans into making the change as well. Morgan describes her plant-based approach as "Plegan," which helped her move beyond traditional definitions of Veganism.

In 2023, Tasting Table said that Morgan is one of the "21 Plant-Based Chefs You Need To Know," and VegNews listed her as one of the "37 Creative Chefs Crafting the Future of Vegan Food." In 2024, VegNews called Morgan one of the "17 Black Vegan Chefs Redefining Plant-Based Food and Community."

=== Book ===
Esquire called her first cookbook, Unbelievably Vegan: 100+ Life-Changing, Plant-Based Recipes: A Cookbook one of the "15 Best Cookbooks of 2022," Forbes named it one of the "13 Of The Best Cookbooks To Keep You Inspired In The Kitchen" in 2022, Runner's World listed it as one of the "6 Best Vegan Cookbooks to Get More Plants in Your Diet" in 2022, Food Network included it as one of the "10 Best New Vegan Cookbooks" for 2023, and Food & Wine said it is one of the "18 Best Vegan Cookbooks for Every Type of Meal" in 2023. VegNews listed Unbelievably Vegan as one of the "Top 100 Vegan Cookbooks of All Time" in 2024.

- Unbelievably Vegan: 100+ Life-Changing, Plant-Based Recipes: A Cookbook. Clarkson Potter, 2022. ISBN 978-0593232989.

=== Media ===
Charity appeared with her husband Derrick in the 2018 documentary The Game Changers, which is about plant-based athletes. Beginning in 2024, Morgan began hosting the food cooking show, Unbelievably Vegan with Chef Charity on Max.

== Personal life ==
Morgan lives in Nashville, Tennessee with her husband Derrick Morgan and their children.

== See also ==
- List of vegan and plant-based media
