= Victor Adebowale, Baron Adebowale =

British politician (born 1962)

The Right Honourable The Lord Adebowale CBE
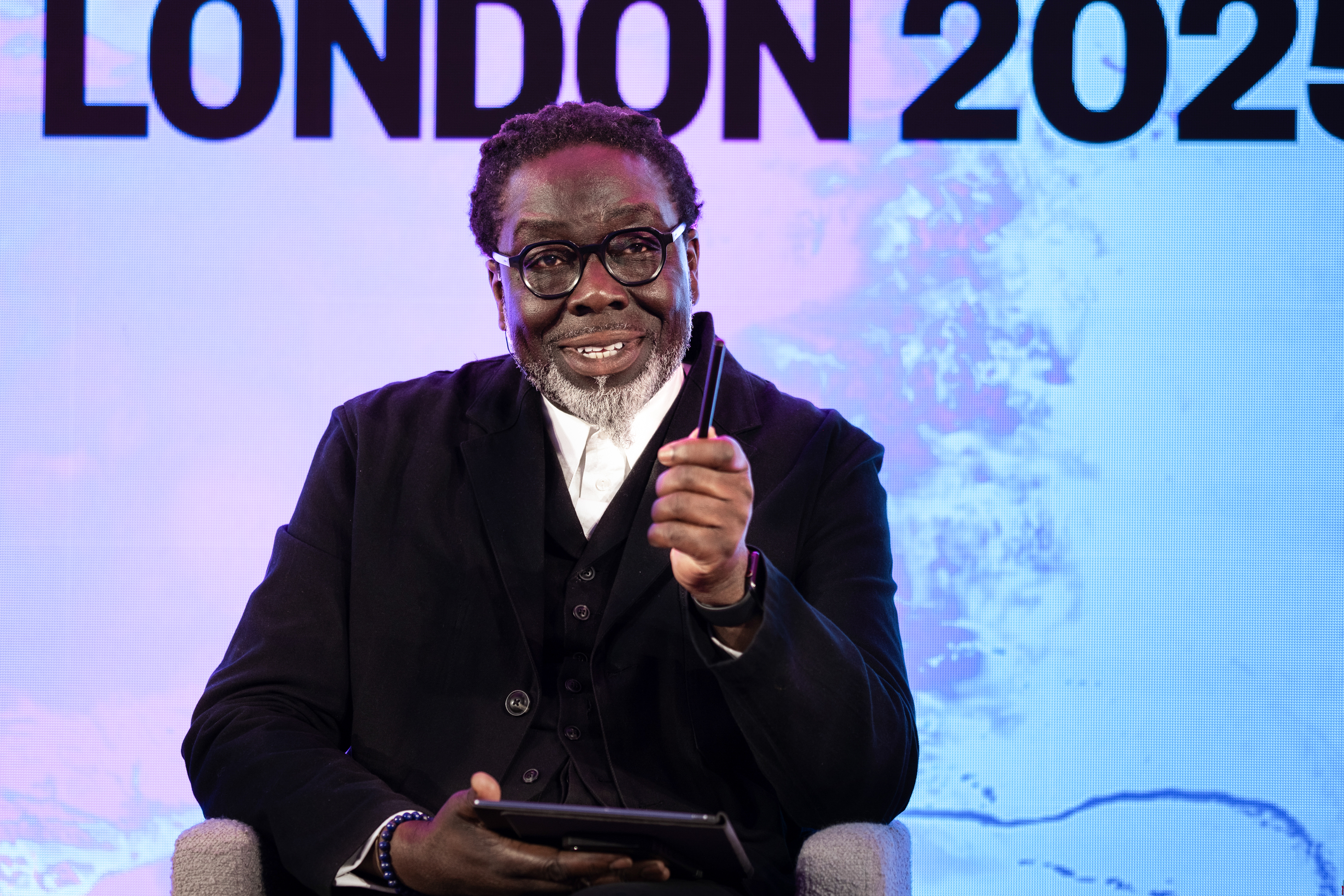
- Lord Adebowale at the SXSW London, June 2025

Member of the House of Lords
- Lord Temporal
- Life peerage 30 June 2001

Personal details
- Born: Victor Olufemi Adebowale; 21 July 1962 (age 64)
- Party: Crossbench

Adebowale's voice
from the BBC programme Desert Island Discs, 30 October 2011

Victor Olufemi Adebowale, Baron Adebowale, CBE (born 21 July 1962) is the former Chief Executive of the social care enterprise Turning Point and the current Chair of the NHS Confederation, and was one of the first individuals to become a People's Peer.

He was appointed a Commander of the Order of the British Empire (CBE) in the 2000 New Year Honours for services to the New Deal, the unemployed, and homeless young people. In 2001 he became one of the first group of people to be appointed as people's peers and was created a life peer on 30 June 2001 taking the title Baron Adebowale, of Thornes in the County of West Yorkshire, sitting as a crossbencher. In 2009 he was listed as one of the 25 most influential people in housing policy over the past 25 years by the housing professionals magazine Inside Housing. He was reckoned by the Health Service Journal to be the 97th most influential person in the English NHS in 2015.

== Life and career ==
Adebowale was born to Nigerian parents Ezekiel and Grace Adebowale, who both worked in the UK's National Health Service. His name "Adebowale" means "the crown comes home" in Yoruba.

Adebowale was educated at Thornes House School, Wakefield and the Polytechnic of North East London. He began his career in Local Authority Estate Management before joining the housing association movement. He spent time with Patchwork Community Housing Association and was Regional Director of the Ujima Housing Association, Britain's largest black-led housing association. He was Director of the Alcohol Recovery Project and then Chief Executive of youth homelessness charity Centrepoint. Adebowale was a member of the Social Exclusion Unit's Policy Action Team on Young People and was Chair of the Review of Social Housing Co-ordination by the Institute of Public Policy Research.

Adebowale joined Turning Point as Chief Executive in September 2001. Turning Point is a care organisation providing services for people with complex needs, including those affected by drug and alcohol misuse, mental health problems and those with a learning disability. In addition to providing direct services, Turning Point also campaigns nationally on behalf of those with social care needs. He left Turning Point in 2019 and became chair of the NHS Confederation.

Adebowale has been involved in a number of taskforce groups, advising the government on mental health, learning disability and the role of the voluntary sector. He is Co-Chair of the Black and Minority Ethnic Mental Health National Steering Group and is a member of the Advisory Council on the Misuse of Drugs. He is a patron of Rich Mix Centre Celebrating Cultural Diversity, a patron of Tomorrow's Project and of the National College for School Leadership. He was a member of the National Employment Panel, the New Economics Foundation Board and is a member of the Institute for Fiscal Studies Council. He is a Director of Leadership in Mind organisational development consultancy, a non-exec of the health IT consultancy IOCOM, Chair of Collaborate and in 2015/16 chaired The London Fairness Commission. He has advised governments of all parties on Employment, Housing, Poverty and Public Service Reform. In 2017 he was appointed to be the chair of Social Enterprise UK, an umbrella body for social enterprises in the UK. In February 2020 he introduced a Commission on Social Investment to record experiences of how the social investment market worked with social enterprises and then produce recommendations for any changes or improvements. The commission's work continued into 2021.

He has also served as a Commissioner of the National Preparedness Commission.

== Academic history and awards ==
Adebowale has an honorary PhD from the University of Central England in Birmingham, an honorary doctorate of letters from the University of Lincoln, an honorary PhD from the University of East London, an honorary doctorate from the University of Bradford, where he is involved with their Centre for Inclusion and Diversity, and most recently an honorary doctorate from the University of York. He is an honorary fellow of London South Bank University and Honorary Senior Fellow in the Health Services Management Centre at the University of Birmingham. In 2009 he was awarded an honorary Doctor of Laws (LLD) degree from Lancaster University.

On 12 December 2008, Adebowale was installed as Chancellor of the University of Lincoln. Adebowale has a Post Graduate Diploma From the Tavistock institute and an MA in Advanced Organisational Consulting from the City University London. He was also a contributing writer for the 2024 book Encounters with James Baldwin: Celebrating 100 years.

== Criticism ==
In 2015, Turning Point was involved in an employment tribunal claiming that Adebowale had unfairly dismissed the charity's IT director, Ibukun Adebayo. Adebayo reported that "the emails she discovered included messages from deputy chief executive David Hoare referring to sex acts, mocking her religious beliefs, and descriptions of Adebayo as “looney tunes” and someone who “employs nutters”." The initial tribunal found that Adebayo's actions in accessing lewd emails about her from the charity's deputy chief executive to Adebowale, constituted gross misconduct, but ruled that this did not justify Adebowale's actions. Both Adebowale and Hoare remained in post without scrutiny. Adebayo's lawyers said that the actions were unfair because the deputy chief executive's behaviour "was more serious than the claimant's by way of his seniority and position as sponsor of Turning Point's equal opportunities policy."

Orders of precedence in the United Kingdom
Preceded by The Lord Browne of Madingley	Gentlemen; Baron Adebowale	Followed by The Lord Grocott
