= Bookmark (TV series) =

British TV series about literature

- Genre: Documentary
- Country of origin: United Kingdom
- Original language: English

Original release
- Network: BBC Two
- Release: 28 September 1983 – 4 April 1999

Bookmark is a BBC documentary series about literature, and in particular the lives of authors, broadcast on BBC Two from 1983 to 1999. The first episode was described in the Radio Times as offering insight into "the stories behind the books you read" and was a magazine format presented by Simon Winchester (1983), later Ian Hamilton (1984–1987).

Later series were mostly single or two-part film studies of an author and his or her works, along similar lines to Arena and Omnibus. These included Philip Larkin, A. S. Byatt, H. G. Wells, Enid Blyton and Rev. W. Awdry ("The Thomas the Tank Engine Man"). The current director of the British Library, Roly Keating, was editor of the programme from 1993 to 1996.
