= Derrick Morgan (American football) =

American football player (born 1989)

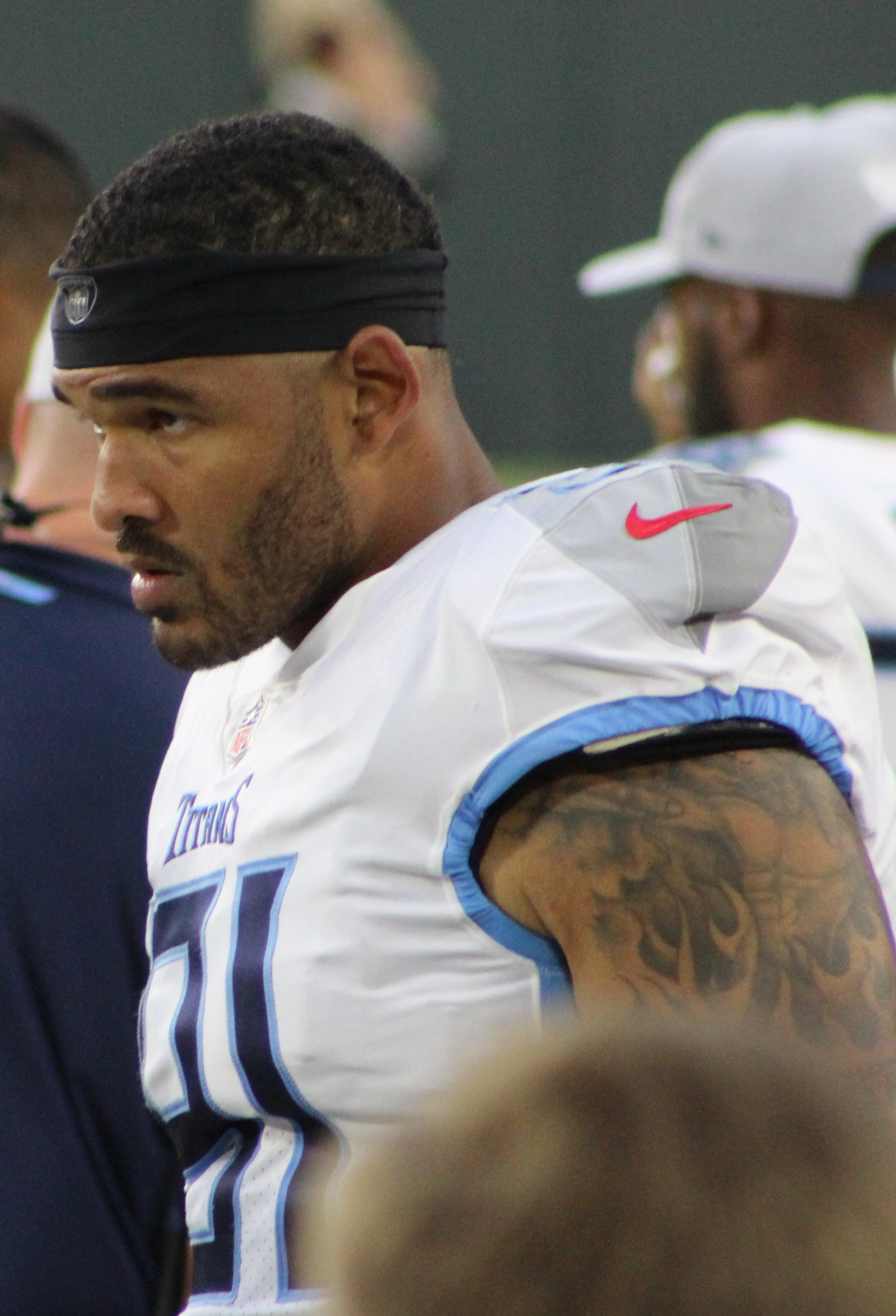
- Morgan with the Titans in 2018

No. 90, 91
- Position: Linebacker

Personal information
- Born: January 6, 1989 (age 37); Lancaster, Pennsylvania, U.S.
- Listed height: 6 ft 4 in (1.93 m)
- Listed weight: 261 lb (118 kg)

Career information
- High school: Coatesville Area (Coatesville, Pennsylvania)
- College: Georgia Tech (2007–2009)
- NFL draft: 2010: 1st round, 16th overall pick

Career history
- Tennessee Titans (2010–2018)

Awards and highlights
- First-team All-American (2009); ACC Defensive Player of the Year (2009); First-team All-ACC (2009)

Career NFL statistics
- Total tackles: 305
- Sacks: 44.5
- Forced fumbles: 5
- Fumble recoveries: 4
- Pass deflections: 26
- Stats at Pro Football Reference

Derrick Lee Morgan (born January 6, 1989) is an American former professional football player who was a linebacker in the National Football League (NFL) for nine seasons with the Tennessee Titans. He was selected 16th overall by the Titans in the 2010 NFL draft after playing college football for the Georgia Tech Yellow Jackets.

== Early life ==
Morgan was born in Lancaster, Pennsylvania. He attended Coatesville Area High School in Coatesville, Pennsylvania, where he played for the Red Raiders football team. As a senior he was named league Defensive Player of the Year and first-team All-State after recording 47 tackles and 7 sacks at the defensive end position. He also rushed for 523 yards and 8 touchdowns as a running back.

== College career ==
Morgan attended the Georgia Institute of Technology from 2007 to 2009, playing for the Georgia Tech Yellow Jackets of the Atlantic Coast Conference. As a true freshman in 2007 he appeared in 12 of 13 games, recording 9 tackles as a reserve defensive end. The following year as a sophomore he started all 13 games, contributing 51 tackles and 7 sacks while earning an honorable mention All-ACC selection. As a junior in 2009, Morgan was named ACC Defensive Player of the Year and earned first-team All-American honors from Associated Press, Pro Football Weekly, and Scout.com. He finished the season with 55 tackles (including 18.5 for a loss) and 12.5 sacks while helping his team to a conference championship. After his junior year, Morgan decided to enter the 2010 NFL draft.

== Professional career ==
Pre-draft measurables
Height	Weight	Arm length	Hand span	40-yard dash	10-yard split	20-yard split	20-yard shuttle	Three-cone drill	Vertical jump	Broad jump	Bench press
6 ft 3 in (1.91 m)	266 lb (121 kg)	34 1/2 in (0.88 m)	9 3/4 in (0.25 m)	4.79 s	1.64 s	2.75 s	4.21 s	7.12 s	36.0 in (0.91 m)	9 ft 10 in (3.00 m)	21 reps
All values from NFL Combine/Pro Day

=== Tennessee Titans ===
Morgan was selected 16th overall by the Tennessee Titans in the 2010 NFL draft. He signed a six-year contract on July 31, 2010, which also included playing time incentives that later voided the final year. He signed a second contract (4-year, $30 million) with the Titans on March 13, 2015, after fielding interest from multiple teams as a free agent.

Morgan played at the 4–3 defensive end position his first four seasons with the Titans, then switched to outside linebacker in 2014 as part of the team's transition to a 3–4 defense. Morgan became a starter on the Titans defense during the 2011 season.

Morgan wore the uniform number 90 until changing to 91 prior to the start of the 2012 season.

==== 2010 season ====
Morgan played in the 2010 season opener, registering a sack in his first NFL game. He suffered a torn left ACL during the fourth game, however, ending his rookie season.

==== 2011 season ====
Morgan made his first NFL start on the seventh game of the 2011 season and remained a starter for the rest of the year. He led the team with 20 quarterback pressures. During the preseason he had arthroscopic surgery on his left knee but missed only the first regular season game.

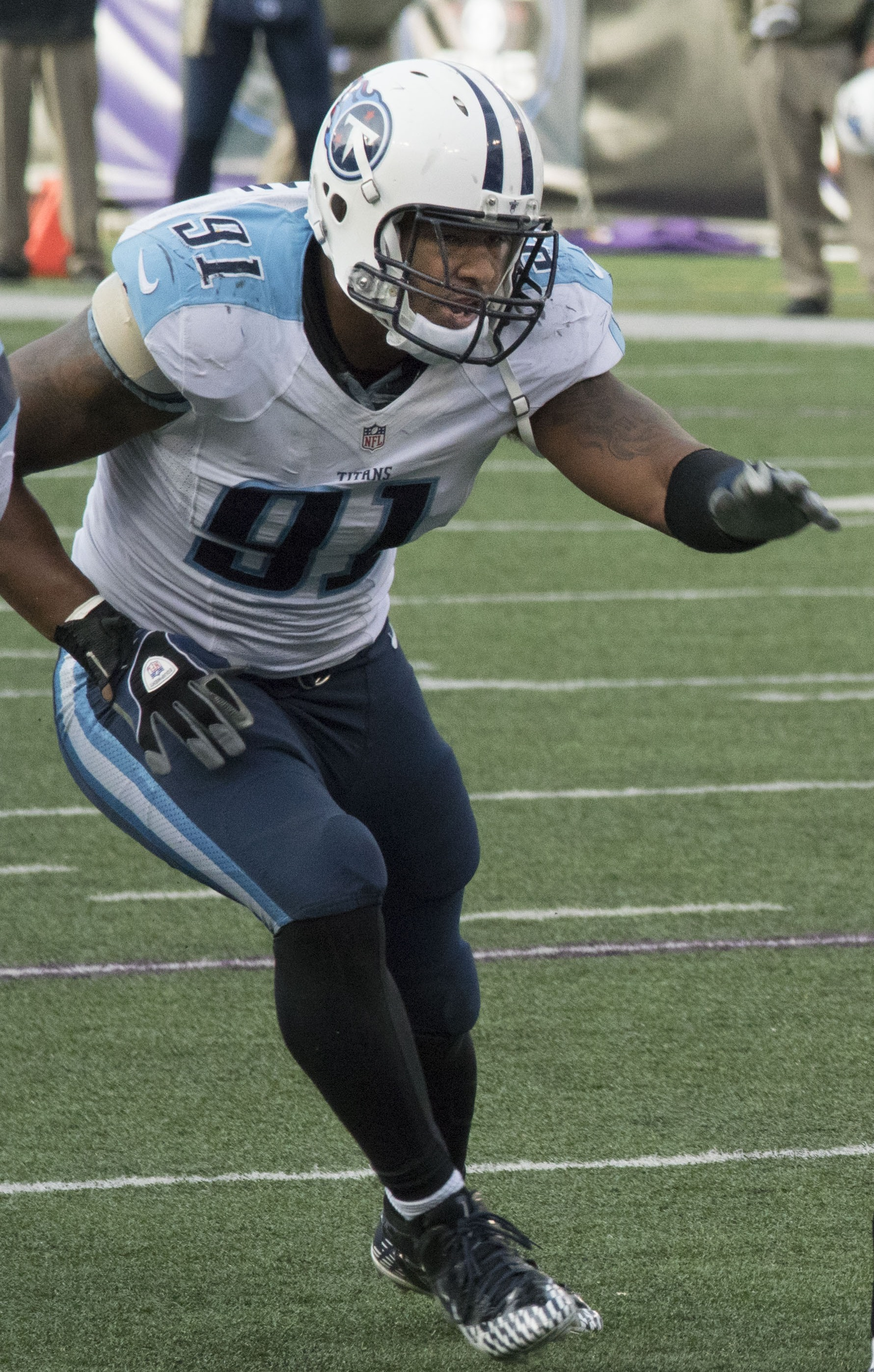
Morgan in 2014

==== 2012 season ====
In 2012, Morgan led the Titans with 6.5 sacks and 19 quarterback pressures while starting all 16 games. Pro Football Focus ranked him as the league's fourth best 4-3 defensive end.

==== 2013 season ====
Morgan was second on the Titans with 6 sacks in 2013.

==== 2014 season ====
During his first year at linebacker in 2014, Morgan led the Titans with 6.5 sacks while starting all 16 games. He also set career highs in tackles (82), quarterback pressures (26), tackles for loss (13), passes defensed (9), and forced fumbles (2). He was rated as the eighth-best 3-4 outside linebacker by Pro Football Focus.

==== 2015 season ====
Morgan had a notable start to the 2015 season, recording 4.5 sacks in the first four games. During the sixth game he suffered a shoulder injury, however. He played through the injury the next four games, then was shut down for the rest of the season. He had surgery on December 15 to repair a torn left labrum.

==== 2016 season ====
Morgan registered a team-high 56 quarterback pressures and career-high 9.0 sacks in 2016. The 9.0 sacks tied him for ninth highest in the AFC.

==== 2017 season ====
Morgan tallied a career-high 59 quarterback pressures in 2017. His 7.5 sacks was the second-best season total of his career.

==== 2018 season ====
In 2018, Morgan played in 13 games with 12 starts, recording 25 tackles, three pass deflections, and a career-low 0.5 sacks. He missed three games due to knee and shoulder injuries.

=== Retirement ===
On July 15, 2019, Morgan announced his retirement from the NFL after nine seasons. He finished his career with 44.5 sacks, sixth all-time in Titans history (including the Houston Oilers era) at the time of his retirement.

=== NFL statistics ===
==== Regular season ====
Year	Team	Games		Tackles				Interceptions						Fumbles	
Year	Team	GP	GS	Comb	Solo	Ast	Sck	Int	Yds	Avg	Lng	TD	PD	FF	FR
2010	TEN	4	0	5	3	2	1.5	0	0	0.0	0	0	1	0	0
2011	TEN	15	10	30	22	8	2.5	0	0	0.0	0	0	2	0	0
2012	TEN	16	16	59	35	24	6.5	0	0	0.0	0	0	5	1	1
2013	TEN	15	14	34	28	6	6.0	0	0	0.0	0	0	2	1	1
2014	TEN	16	16	63	43	20	6.5	0	0	0.0	0	0	7	2	0
2015	TEN	10	9	24	17	7	4.5	0	0	0.0	0	0	2	1	0
2016	TEN	15	15	33	24	9	9.0	0	0	0.0	0	0	1	0	0
2017	TEN	14	14	32	16	16	7.5	0	0	0.0	0	0	2	0	2
2018	TEN	13	12	25	19	6	0.5	0	0	0.0	0	0	3	0	1
Career		118	106	306	208	98	44.5	0	0	0.0	0	0	25	5	5

==== Postseason ====
Year	Team	Games		Tackles				Interceptions						Fumbles	
Year	Team	GP	GS	Comb	Total	Ast	Sck	Int	Yds	Avg	Lng	TD	PD	FF	FR
2017	TEN	2	2	5	3	2	1.0	0	0	0.0	0	0	0	0	0
Career		2	2	5	3	2	1.0	0	0	0.0	0	0	0	0	0

== Medical cannabis advocacy ==
Morgan has spoken publicly about the medicinal properties of cannabis that he believes could benefit NFL players, particularly in treating and preventing the serious brain injuries and diseases that have afflicted many players. Morgan has called on the NFL to conduct research on the neuroprotective benefits of cannabis, as part of the league's stated commitment to making player health and safety issues a top priority. Morgan has also donated money to help fund medical cannabis research.

Morgan follows the lead of Eugene Monroe, who in March 2016 became the first active NFL player to openly advocate for the league to change its cannabis policy. Morgan and Monroe appeared together in a June 2016 interview with Katie Couric, the first time Morgan had spoken on the subject.

In November 2016, the NFL Player's Association announced the formation of a committee to study issues of pain management among players, including the use of cannabis as treatment. Morgan was named as a founding member of the committee.

Also in November 2016, Morgan was among the signatories of an open letter addressed to the NFL, urging a change in the league's policy towards cannabis. The letter was penned by Doctors for Cannabis Regulation and signed by several other NFL players.

Morgan is a board member of Athletes for Care, a group that advocates for athletes on various issues of health and safety including the use of cannabis as medicine. Morgan is also co-chair of the Doctors for Cannabis Regulation NFL steering committee.

During a 2017 game against the Houston Texans, Morgan wore a pair of cannabis-themed cleats as part of the NFL's "My Cause, My Cleats" campaign. The cleats promoted Realm of Caring Foundation, a non-profit organization supporting medical cannabis research.

== Post-NFL career ==
Having already began a career as a real estate investor during his playing career, Morgan created the KNGDM Impact Fund, an Opportunity Zone fund to help investment in marginalized communities. He is also a brand ambassador for Beyond Meat.

== Personal life ==
Morgan graduated from Georgia Tech with a degree in business management. In 2016 he graduated from the University of Miami's Executive MBA for Artists and Athletes program. Morgan is also a member of the Kappa Alpha Psi fraternity.

After Morgan's wife, Chef Charity Morgan, helped him to transition to a plant-based diet in early 2017, the couple convinced several other Tennessee Titans into making the change as well. Both Derrick and Charity appeared in the 2018 documentary about athletes who turn to a plant-based diet, The Game Changers. Morgan delivered his second child at home in April 2015.

In 2011, Morgan participated in a 24-day charity mission to deliver 22,000 hearing aids to children and adults in need across Africa.
