= European Defence Industrial Strategy =

2024 EU Policy Document

The European Defence Industrial Strategy (EDIS) is a document released on 5 March 2024 by the von Der Leyen Commission, which suggested to switch to "war economy mode" due to the 2022 Russian invasion of Ukraine and fears over Donald Trump's rumoured withdrawal from NATO. European Commissioner for Internal Market Thierry Breton said: "Europe must take greater responsibility for its own security, regardless of the outcome of our allies' elections every four years."

One proposal was to set up "a European version of the U.S. Foreign Military Sales scheme, which helps other governments buy from American companies", but HRVP Josep Borrell noted that "we don't have a Pentagon anywhere."

Several reporters noted that the proposals needed to be approved by the European Parliament and by all 27 member states of the European Union, including Ireland which as noted by Euronews remains neutral. The proposal was based on a €1.5 billion injection, over three years, which was termed "massive" by Der Spiegel, but "modest" by Euronews, which complained that the EDIS failed to "set up the €100bn fund previously promised by Commissioner Thierry Breton" and "the idea of creating European defence bonds" suggested by European Council President Charles Michel was absent, and lamented by Gabriele Rosana, a Brussels-based policy analyst who pointed at the €800 billion Next Generation EU programme.

The Commission noted the observation of France's Institute for International and Strategic Affairs (IRIS) that, of the €100 billion spent by member states in the period between February 2022 and June 2023, eight out of every ten euros were spent outside the EU, and more than six out of every ten euros were spent in the US, but it also became apparent that EIB "policy" or "its rules explicitly" then forbid defence investment. Borrell was alarmed that the EIB was not in compliance with its own statute in Article 309 of the TFEU.

Royal Military School teacher and Université catholique de Louvain researcher Alain De Neve said it was clear that von der Leyen had not embarked on a war economy, while it had encouraged member states collaboratively to procure at least 40% of their materiel by 2030. The EDIS would provide incentives for joint procurement of war materiel. Commission Vice-president Margrethe Vestager acknowledged that the programme was "not a lot of money when it comes to the defence industry".

The EDIS was released alongside a European Defence Industry Programme (EDIP), which was budgeted in 2025–27 with €1.5 billion. One reporter writes that the EDIP funds were "redeployed from a recent increase of the European Defence Fund." The text relies substantially on the Versailles Declaration of 11 March 2022, and seeks to ensure the availability and supply of defence products. The EDIP was meant to bridge the gap between past emergency measures and the next Multiannual Financial Framework in 2027. The funds are meant to de-risk investment in the production capacities of the European defence industry, and cooperation with Ukrainian defence industry is foreseen. The EDIP programme is open to recipients in EU Member States, Associated Countries and Ukraine.
