= Roly Keating =

Chief Executive of the British Library (born 1961)

Sir Roly Keating
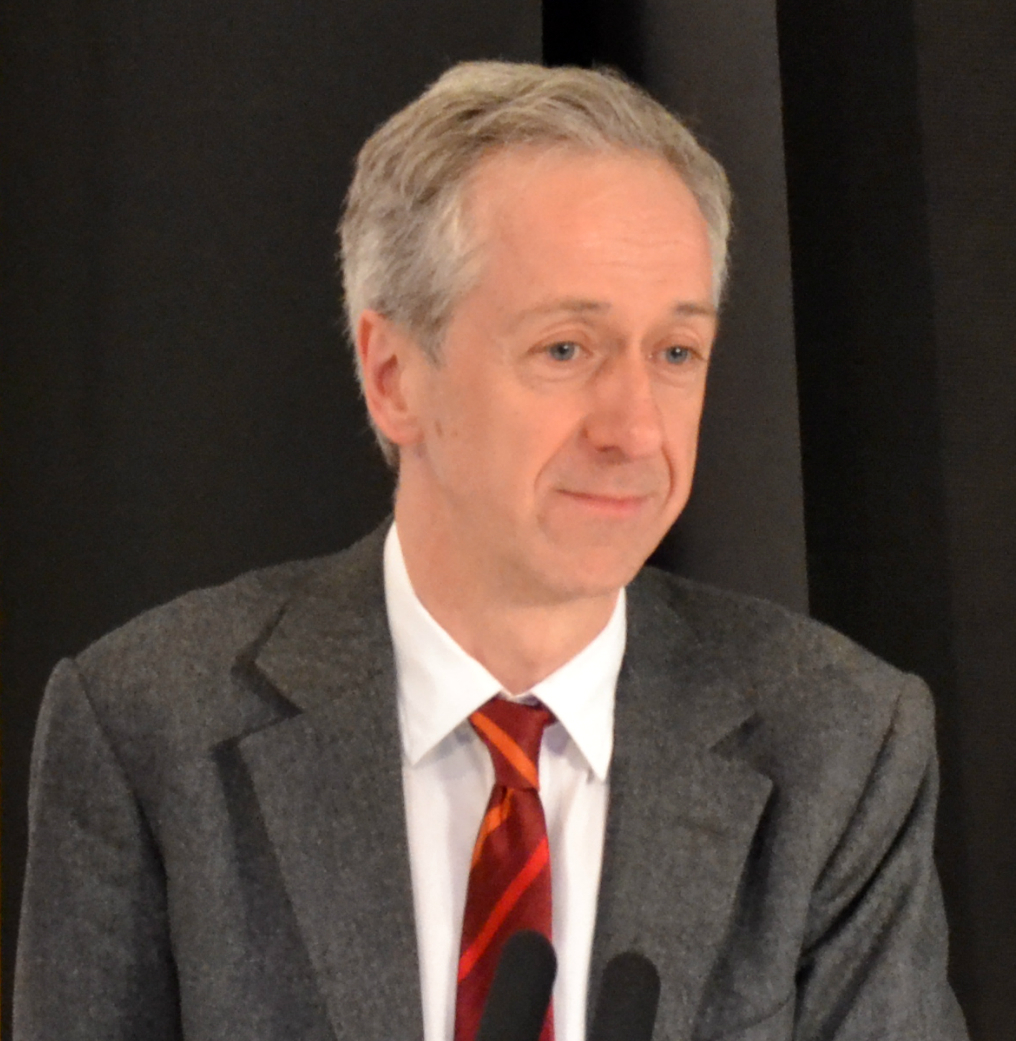
- Keating in 2013
- Born: Roland Francis Kester Keating; 5 August 1961 (age 64)
- Education: Westminster School
- Alma mater: Balliol College, Oxford
- Title: Controller of BBC Four (2002–2004); Controller of BBC Two (2004–2008); Director of Archive Content, BBC (2008–2012); Director of The British Library (2012–2024)
- Spouse: Caroline Russell (m. 1989)
- Children: 3

Sir Roland Francis Kester Keating (born 5 August 1961) is a British executive who was chief executive of the British Library from September 2012 to December 2024.

In his previous career at the BBC he launched BBC Four and served as Controller of BBC Two from 2004 to 2008. Keating is a governor of the Southbank Centre, a trustee of Sheffield DocFest and Clore Leadership and an advisory board member of the Institute for Innovation and Public Purpose at University College London.

== Early life and education ==
Keating was born on 5 August 1961 to Donald Norman Keating and Betty Katharine Keating (née Wells). He was educated at Westminster School, and then read classics at Balliol College, Oxford.

== Career ==
=== BBC ===
Keating joined the BBC in 1983. He was a producer and director for the Arts and Music department, making programmes for Omnibus, Bookmark (1992–97) and Arena. He was a producer and later became editor of The Late Show. In 1997, he became head of programming for UKTV, partly owned by the BBC. In 1999, he became the BBC Controller of Digital Channels. In 2000, he also took on the responsibility of Controller of Arts Commissioning.

Keating became the Controller of digital television station BBC Four in December 2001, masterminding its launch on 2 March 2002. Notable commissions included The Falklands Play, The Alan Clark Diaries and The Thick of It The new channel also provided extended coverage of the BBC Proms, regular screenings of foreign-language films and series, and an increased volume of international documentaries under the Storyville strand. In 2003, he was also joint leader of the BBC's Charter Review project for six months. He became the channel controller for BBC Two in June 2004, a position he held until 2008. While controller, he said that he wanted to see BBC Two be the first mainstream British television channel available on broadband. His decision to screen Jerry Springer: The Opera on 8 January 2005 prompted complaints and personal threats, and he was given security protection.

Keating was appointed temporary controller of BBC One following Peter Fincham's resignation on 5 October 2007. In 2008, he was appointed Director of Archive Content for the BBC with responsibility for maximising public access to the BBC’s content across television, radio and multimedia, including editorial oversight of BBC iPlayer and UKTV. The Times alleged that he received a severance package of £375,000 due to his role being closed, which he later paid back in full after learning it wasn't authorised properly.

=== British Library ===
Keating was announced as chief executive designate of the British Library in May 2012, to succeed Dame Lynne Brindley.

Keating oversaw the implementation in 2013 of the Legal Deposit Libraries (Non-Print Works) Regulations, which mandated collection and preservation of e-books and websites published in UK. The following year saw the completion of the Library’s £33m newspaper programme, including the opening of the National Newspaper Building at the Library’s site at Boston Spa in West Yorkshire.

Under Keating’s tenure the Library expanded its partnerships and activities with the wider UK library sector. He served as a member of the expert panel for William Sieghart’s Independent Library Report for England. In 2014 he oversaw the incorporation into the British Library of the Public Lending Right for the UK and Ireland, following a Government decision to close the latter as a standalone body. Other initiatives include the creation of the Living Knowledge Network, a pan-UK alliance of public and national libraries based on sharing of skills, events and exhibitions, and the expansion of the Library’s Business & IP Centre network to 21 sites in public libraries around the UK.

As of 2015, Keating was paid a salary of between £155,000 and £159,999 by the British Library, making him one of the 328 most highly paid people in the British public sector at that time. Keating received performance based bonuses of between £15,000 and £20,000 in the tax years 2019/20 and 2020/21, and again in the tax years 2022/23 and 2023/24. In February 2023, the Library had proposed a £500m community expansion, which would incorporate new galleries, event spaces, a community garden and The Alan Turing Institute, the UK's national institute for data science and artificial intelligence.

Keating was knighted in the 2023 New Year Honours for services to literature.

In 2023, following the British Library cyberattack, Keating exclaimed a "degree of upset, of anger" over the most serious crisis the Library had encountered in decades. In March 2024 Keating published a report called Learning Lessons from the cyber-attack, stating in his blog that “its goal is to share our understanding of what happened and to help others learn from our experience. The incident highlighted criticisms of Keating's tenure, particularly regarding historic underinvestment in IT infrastructure and staff, which many believe left the Library vulnerable to such attacks. In his reflections on the incident, Keating admitted that this underinvestment had been a significant oversight. Writing on the British Library blog, Keating said '...Although this kind of attack was something we had prepared for and rehearsed, and had taken steps to guard against, it was no less of a shock when it happened.' Despite the damage and cost of the cyber attack, Keating accepted a bonus payment worth between £10,000 and £15,000 in the tax year ending 2023/24.

In April 2024, 6 months after the cyber attack, Keating gave 12 months notice of his resignation as Chief Executive of the British Library, effective April 2025. He stepped down in January 2025, and was succeeded as chief executive by Rebecca Lawrence.

== Personal life ==
In 1989, Keating married Caroline Russell. Together they have three children: one son and two daughters.

Media offices
New creation	Controller of BBC Four; 2002 to 2004	Succeeded by Janice Hadlow
Preceded by Jane Root	Controller of BBC Two; 2004 to 2008	Succeeded by Janice Hadlow
Preceded by ??? as ???	Director of Archive Content, BBC; 2008 to 2012	Succeeded by Tony Ageh as Controller of BBC Archives
Cultural offices
Preceded by Dame Lynne Brindley	Director of The British Library; 2012 to 2024	Succeeded by Rebecca Lawrence
