= Rebecca Lawrence =

British civil servant

Rebecca Lawrence is a British public servant. In October 2024, it was announced that she would be then next chief executive of the British Library; she succeeded Sir Roly Keating on 2 January 2025. On 3 November 2025, she resigned with immediate effect.

== Biography ==
Lawrence studied philosophy, politics and economics at New College, Oxford, having matriculated in 1989. Following graduation, she studied at Harvard University with a Harlech Scholarship in 1993.

After first working in the banking sector, Lawrence joined HM Treasury in 1994. She later moved to the Home Office and then to work for the Association of Chief Police Officers. She was director and then chief executive officer of the London Mayor's Office for Policing and Crime between 2013 and 2019. She then served as CEO of the Crown Prosecution Service (CPS) from September 2019 to 2023. She brought claims of discrimination against the CPS on the grounds of age and sex. The case was settled for an unknown sum before the start of the tribunal hearing on 17 November 2023, and her departure from the CPS was then announced later the same day, described as a "natural transition point".

She is a Commissioner of the National Preparedness Commission.

Cultural offices
Preceded by Sir Roly Keating	Director of The British Library; 2025 to present	Incumbent
