= European Defence Industry Programme =

Initiative of the European Union

The European Defence Industry Programme is an initiative of the European Union aiming at developing the EU defense industry by providing for the period 2025-2027 (until the next Multiannual Financial Framework) €1.5 billion in the form of grants to the European Defense industry. The Commission announced the creation of EDIP in March 2024, when it also presented a new European Defence Industrial Strategy. It is part of the Readiness 2030 strategy and defines joint procurement for the defense industry. EDIP also builds upon the European Defence Industry Reinforcement through the common Procurement Act (EDIRPA) which allocated €300 million to Member States joint acquisitions of military equipment , in order to support common purchasing of defence products. EDIRPA funding required the minimum involvement of three Member States and the programme was operational until 31 December 2025.

The EDIP regulation was negotiated by the co-legislators, with the Committees of the European Parliament in charge of these issues pushing for increasing EDIP's budget to 21 billion euro. It passed through European Council under qualified majority. On 8 December 2025, the European Council adopted the EDIP regulation, which will enter into force in the last weeks of 2025.
