= Tim Lang (nutritionist) =

British food policy professor (born 1948)

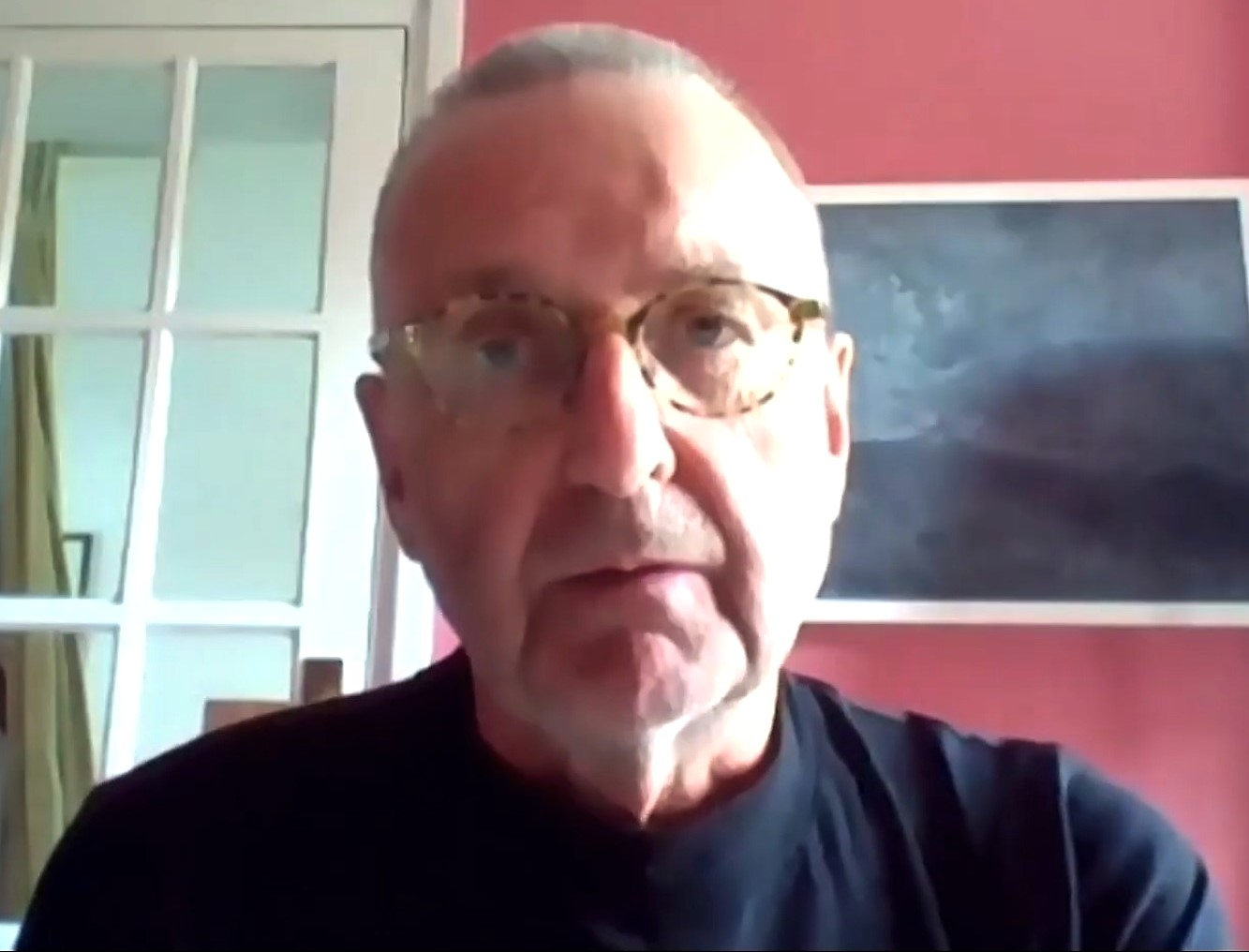
Lang speaks to the British Library in 2020

Timothy Mark Lang (born January 1948) is Emeritus professor of food policy at City University London's Centre for Food Policy since 2002. He founded the Centre in 1994 and also founded the Cambridge Forum for Sustainability and the Environment.

In February 2024, Lang authored a report for the National Preparedness Commission on food security, specifically civil resilience in protecting the UK food supply.

== Selected publications ==
- Atlas of Food (with E Millstone, Earthscan 2003/2008)
- Food Policy (with D Barling and M Caraher, Oxford University Press, 2009)
- Ecological Public Health (with Geof Rayner, Routledge Earthscan, 2012)
- Food Wars (with Michael Heasman, Routledge, 2015)
- Unmanageable Consumer (with Yiannis Gabriel, Sage, 2015)
- A Food Brexit: Time to get real (2017) (With Erik Millstone & Terry Marsden)
- "Coronavirus: rationing based on health, equity and decency now needed – food system expert", The Conversation, 2020.
- Feeding Britain, Our Food Problems and How to Fix Them. Penguin, 2020.
