= Elisabeth Braw =

Swedish journalist and security expert

Helena Elisabeth Braw is a Swedish security expert and former journalist active in the United Kingdom. She led the Modern Deterrence project at the defense and security think tank RUSI in London before becoming a senior fellow at the Scowcroft Center for Strategy and Security at the Atlantic Council. She is particularly known for her expertise in hybrid and greyzone threats; societal resilience and total defence; and the intersection between geopolitics and the globalised economy.

Braw was born December 2, 1973, in Tingsås parish in Kronoberg county. She is the daughter of the priest and writer Christian Braw and music director Karin Braw, nee Imberg, sister of Daniel Braw and granddaughter of Lars Braw and niece of Monica Braw.

She studied in Germany, and her thesis was about the reduction of nuclear weapons in Europe. She worked in the late 1990s in Washington, D.C., then for a time in Italy, then again in Washington, and then in San Francisco. She has been a visiting fellow at the University of Oxford. As a journalist, she took particular interest in security policy issues. She is a columnist for Foreign Policy and Politico Europe and regularly writes for the Financial Times, The Times and other publications. She is a well-known commentator and public speaker on issues of geopolitics.

Braw is the author of the award-winning Goodbye Globalization: The Return of a Divided World; The Defender's Dilemma; and God's Spies. Braw released a book on damage to undersea cables titled Undersea War in October 2026.

== Books ==
- God's Spies: The Stasi’s Cold War Espionage Campaign inside the Church (2019)
- The Defender’s Dilemma: Identifying and Deterring Gray-Zone Aggression (2022)
- Goodbye, Globalization: The Return of a Divided World (2024)
- Undersea War: The Battle to Control the Cables and Pipelines That Connect Our World (2026)
