= Koninklijke Militaire School =

Dutch military school

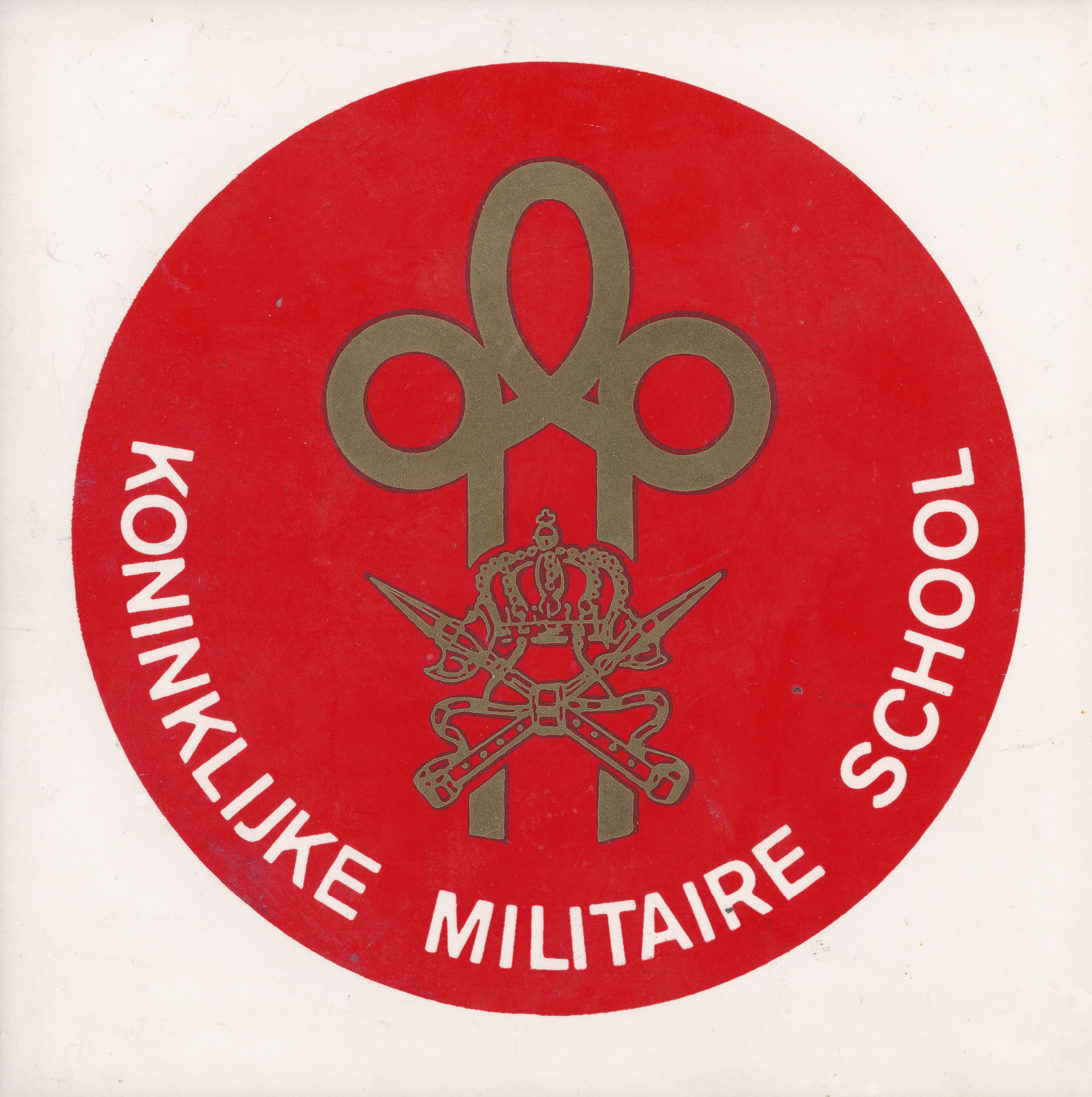
Koninklijke Militaire School KMS Logo

Koninklijke Militaire School (KMS) is a Dutch military school in the Netherlands training soldiers and non-commissioned officers for the Royal Netherlands Army.

== History ==
The KMS began as the Onderofficiers School (OOS), in 1952, in Weert; it was renamed KMS in 1961. The buildings had been constructed just before World War II, and had been used by the British Army to station troops after the liberation of the Netherlands.

NCOs were formerly trained in the Van Hornekazerne in Weert, but the Dutch government decided to move those facilities to the Jan van Schaffelaerkazerne, in Ermelo, an operation that was completed in 2015. That move gave new life to the military installations in Ermelo, which had suffered severely when the Regiment Infanterie Oranje Gelderland was removed from the base. In 2018 the school in Ermelo was allotted more money to increase the number of graduates by 15% annually.

== Program ==
Lower ranks (soldiers and corporals) learn basic military skills at the Algemene Militaire Opleiding in one of three schools (School Noord in Assen; School Zuid in Oirschot; School Luchtmobiel in Arnhem). NCOs (sergeants to adjutants/warrant officers) are trained in three stages at the KMS in Ermelo. (The Koninklijke Militaire Academie trains commissioned officers.)

== Alumni ==
- Dési Bouterse, president of Suriname
- Marco Kroon
