= Unemployment insurance in the United States =

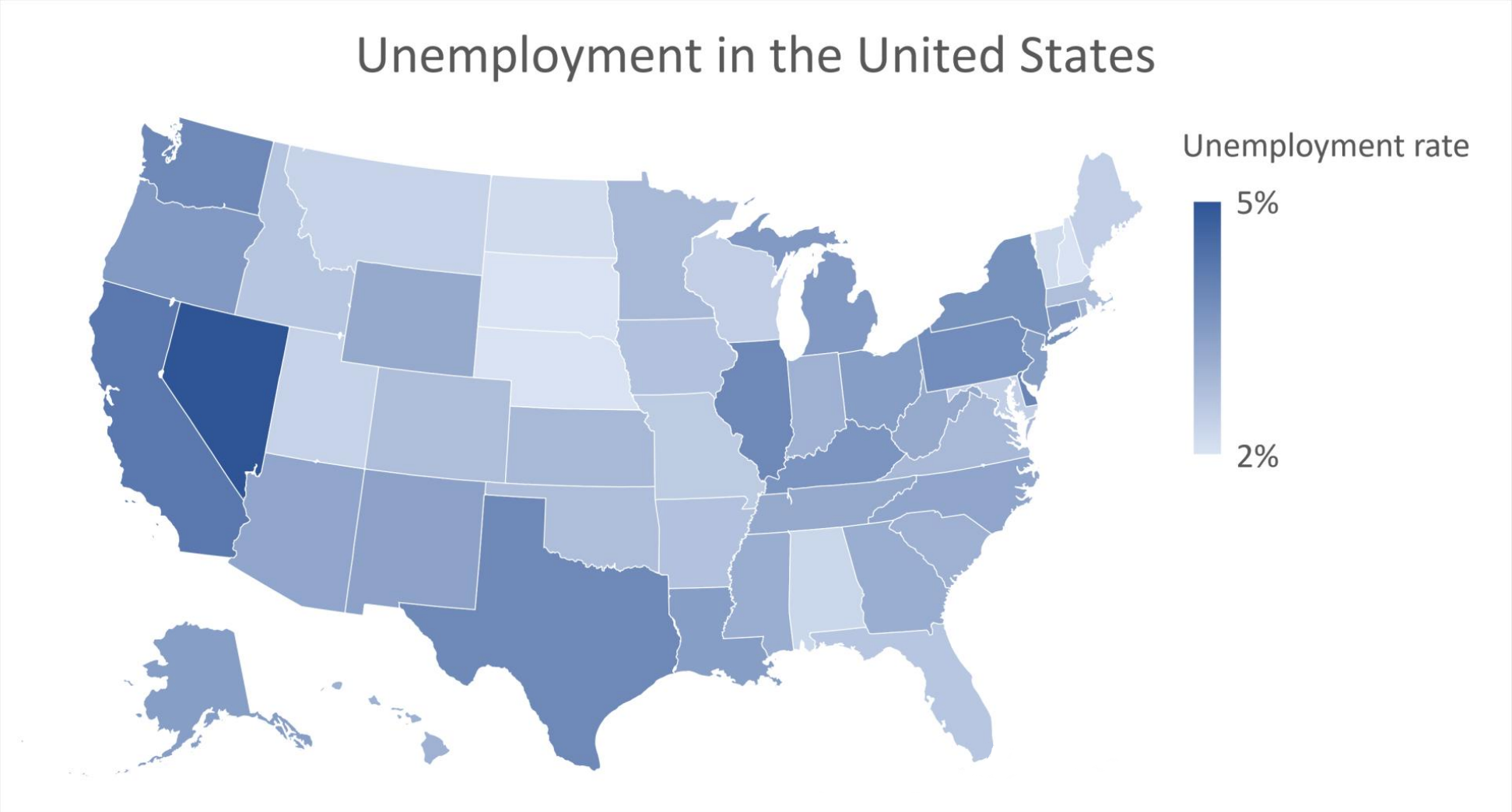
Unemployment in the United States (June 2023)

Unemployment rate by county from January 1990 to March 2017

Unemployment insurance in the United States, colloquially referred to as unemployment benefits, refers to social insurance programs which replace a portion of wages for individuals during unemployment. The first unemployment insurance program in the U.S. was created in Wisconsin in 1932, and the federal Social Security Act of 1935 created programs nationwide that are administered by state governments. The constitutionality of the program was upheld by the Supreme Court in 1937.

Each of the 50 U.S. states, as well as the District of Columbia, Puerto Rico, and U.S. Virgin Islands, administer their own unemployment insurance programs. Benefits are generally paid by state governments, funded in large part by state and federal payroll taxes levied on employers, to workers who have become unemployed through no fault of their own. Employees in Alaska, New Jersey and Pennsylvania are also required to contribute into the program. Benefit amounts for eligible workers vary by state, ranging from maximum weekly payments of $1,015 in Massachusetts to $235 in Mississippi as of 2022. According to the Internal Revenue Code, these benefits are classified as "social welfare benefits" and as such are included in a taxpayer's gross income. The standard duration of available unemployment compensation is six months, although extensions are possible during economic downturns. During the Great Recession, unemployment benefits were extended by 73 weeks.

Eligibility requirements for unemployment insurance vary by state, but generally speaking, employees not fired for misconduct ("terminated for cause") are eligible for unemployment benefits, while those fired for misconduct (this sometimes can include misconduct committed outside the workplace, such as a problematic social media post or committing a crime) are not. In every state, employees who quit their job without "good cause" are not eligible for unemployment benefits, but the definition of good cause varies by state. In some states, being fired for misconduct completely invalidates the employee's unemployment claim, while in others it only disqualifies the employee from receiving unemployment benefits for a short period.

== History ==
As many European countries created unemployment insurance programs in the early 20th century (beginning with Britain in 1912), Progressive Era reformers advocated for a similar policy in the United States, but to little avail. In the early 20th century, some trade unions and employers set up private unemployment insurance programs for workers, but these were only available to a small portion of the workforce. Following the onset of the Great Depression, advocates pushed Congress and state legislatures to create public unemployment insurance programs. In 1931, governors from New York, Ohio, Massachusetts, Pennsylvania, New Jersey, and Connecticut organized an interstate commission on unemployment insurance. In 1932, Wisconsin passed the first public unemployment insurance program in the United States, offering 50% wage compensation for a maximum of 10 weeks, funded through a payroll tax imposed on employers.

Programs were created in other states following the passage of the federal Social Security Act of 1935. Under Title III of the Act, the federal government would levy a payroll tax on almost all employers to fund unemployment insurance programs run by state governments, conditional on states following certain minimum requirements concerning program administration. In states that levied their own taxes to administer programs that exceeded the requirements, the federal government would forgive this payroll tax. The terms of this federal-state cooperation are set by the Federal Unemployment Tax Act (FUTA), which authorizes the Internal Revenue Service (IRS) to collect an annual federal employer tax used to fund state workforce agencies. In 1937, the Supreme Court held that federal unemployment law is constitutional and does not violate the Tenth Amendment in Steward Machine Company v. Davis, 301 U.S. 548.

Beginning in 1954 under the Reed Act, the federal government transfers unemployment funds to state governments when the federal balance exceeds a certain threshold. Additionally, FUTA provides a fund that states can borrow from when needed to continue paying UI benefits. In 1970, FUTA was amended to create an extended benefits program where the federal government pays half the cost of extended benefits triggered during periods of high state-level unemployment.

In 1986, the Tax Reform Act required that unemployment compensation be considered taxable income for the purposes of federal taxes. In 2003, Rep. Philip English introduced legislation to repeal the taxation of unemployment compensation, but the legislation did not advance past committee. Most states with income tax consider unemployment compensation to be taxable. Under the American Recovery and Reinvestment Act of 2009, the first $2,400 worth of unemployment income received during the tax year of 2009 was exempted from being considered as taxable income on the federal level.

== Structure ==
=== Taxation ===
Unemployment insurance is funded by both federal and state payroll taxes. In most states, employers pay state and federal unemployment taxes if: (1) they paid wages to employees totaling $1,500 or more in any quarter of a calendar year, or (2) they had at least one employee during any day of a week for 20 or more weeks in a calendar year, regardless of whether those weeks were consecutive. Some state laws differ from the federal law.

Since June 2011, the Federal Unemployment Tax Act (FUTA) has set the taxable wage base as the first $7,000 of wages paid to each employee during a calendar year, and the tax rate as 6% of taxable wages. (Note: Until June 2011, the FUTA tax rate was 3% of taxable wages collected from employers of at least four employees.) Employers can deduct up to 90% of the amount due if they paid taxes to a state to support a system of unemployment insurance which met Federal standards. Employers who pay the state unemployment tax on time receive an offset credit of up to 5.4% regardless of the rate of tax they pay their state. Therefore, the net FUTA tax rate is generally 0.6% (6.0%–5.4%) on the taxable amount of $7,000, for a maximum FUTA tax of $42.00 per employee per year.

State law determines individual state unemployment insurance tax rates and taxable wage bases. Although FUTA mandates a taxable wage base of $7,000 per employee, only Arizona, California, and Puerto Rico use this minimum as of 2020. The taxable wage base ranges significantly, with Washington using the highest amount of $52,700. All states use experience rating to determine tax rates, meaning that employers using the system more often have to pay additional taxes. As such, the range of state unemployment tax rates varies widely. For example, as of 2020, the state employer tax range for unemployment insurance is 0.05%–6.42% in Arizona, 1.5%–6.2% in California, 0.94%–14.37% in Massachusetts, and 0.1%–5.5% in Oklahoma.

An exception to the federal-state joint funding mechanism is the Pandemic Unemployment Insurance (PUA) program created during the COVID-19 pandemic, which is funded entirely by the federal government.

=== Eligibility ===
The federal government sets broad guidelines for coverage and eligibility, but states vary in how they determine benefits and eligibility. Generally, the following requirements apply:

- A worker must have worked for at least one quarter in the previous year. Workers are normally not eligible if they were temporary workers or paid under the table.
- A worker must meet state requirements for wages earned or time worked during an established period of time (referred to as a "base period") to be eligible for benefits. In most states, the base period is usually the first four out of the last five completed calendar quarters prior to the time that the claim is filed.
- A worker must have been laid off by an employer. Workers are not normally eligible if they quit without good cause, are fired for misconduct, or became unemployed due to a labor dispute. If the employer demonstrates that the unemployed person quit or was fired for cause, the worker is required to pay back the benefits they received.
- A worker must be available for work and must accept a suitable offer of employment

If the worker's claim is denied, then they have the right to appeal. If the worker was fired for misconduct, then the employer has the burden to prove that the termination of employment is a misconduct defined by individual states laws. However, if the employee quit their job, then they must prove that their voluntary separation must be good cause.

=== Benefit amount and duration ===
Unemployment benefit amounts are based on reported covered quarterly earnings. The amount of earnings and the number of quarters worked are used to determine the length and value of the unemployment benefit. The national average weekly payment in 2020 was $378. Since 1987, unemployment compensation has been considered taxable income by the federal government.

For most states, the maximum period for receiving benefits is 26 weeks. Since a 1970 amendment to FUTA, there has been an extended benefit program that may be triggered by the state unemployment rate. Congress has also often passed temporary programs to extend benefits during recessions. This was done with the Temporary Extended Unemployment Compensation (TEUC) program in 2002–2003, which has since expired, and remained in force through June 2, 2010, with the Extended Unemployment Compensation 2008 legislation. As a result of the American Recovery and Reinvestment Act passed in February 2009, many unemployed people receive up to 99 weeks of unemployment benefits, contingent on state legislation. In July 2010, legislation that provides an extension of federal extended unemployment benefits through November 2010 was signed by the president. The legislation extended benefits for 2.3 million unemployed workers who had exhausted their unemployment benefits.

=== Application process ===
It generally takes two weeks for benefit payments to begin, the first being a "waiting week", which is not reimbursed, and the second being the time lag between eligibility for the program and the first benefit actually being paid.

To begin a claim, the unemployed worker must apply for benefits through a state unemployment agency. In certain instances, the employer initiates the process. Generally, the certification includes the affected person affirming that they are "able and available for work", the amount of any part-time earnings they may have had, and whether they are actively seeking work. These certifications are usually accomplished either over the Internet or via an interactive voice response telephone call, but in a few states may be by mail. After receiving an application, the state will notify the individual if they qualify and the rate they will receive every week. The state will also review the reason for separation from employment. Many states require the individual to periodically certify that the conditions of the benefits are still met.

Federal taxes are not withheld from unemployment compensation at the time of payment unless requested by the recipient using Form W-4V.

=== Disqualification and appeals ===
If a worker's reason for separation from their last job is due to some reason other than a "lack of work," a determination will be made about whether they are eligible for benefits. Generally, all determinations of eligibility for benefits are made by the appropriate state under its law or applicable federal laws. If a worker is disqualified or denied benefits, they have the right to file an appeal within an established time-frame. The state will advise a worker of his or her appeal rights. An employer may also appeal a determination if they do not agree with the state's determination regarding the employee's eligibility.

If the worker's claim is denied, then they have the right to appeal. If the worker was fired for misconduct, then the employer has the burden to prove substantially that the termination of employment is a misconduct defined by individual states laws. However, if the employee quit their job, then they must prove that their voluntary separation must be for good cause.

Success rate of unemployment appeals is two-thirds, or 67% of the time for the most claimants. In the state of Oklahoma, claimants generally win 51.5% of the time in misconduct cases. In the State of New Jersey, claimants that were discharged as a result of a misconduct may still receive unemployment benefits after their disqualification period of six week has ended.

=== Payment through prepaid debit cards ===
Most states deliver unemployment benefits to recipients who do not have a bank account through a prepaid debit card. The federal government uses the Direct Express Debit Mastercard prepaid debit card offered by Mastercard and Comerica Bank to give some federal assistance payments to people who do not have bank accounts. Many states have similar programs for unemployment payments and other assistance.

=== Participation rates ===
Variations in eligibility requirements, time limits, time commitment for mandatory programs, the difficulty of filing successfully, and payout amounts have led to very different participation rates across the country. Immediately before the COVID-19 pandemic, 7.6% of unemployed people in Florida received benefits; 65.9% of unemployed people in Massachusetts did. Unemployment insurance programs have been criticized for being intentionally difficult to access.

=== Improper payments and fraud ===
If a worker receives benefit payments for which they are not eligible, the state is empowered to recoup the excess amount paid to the claimant (an overpayment). If a worker receives less benefits than they are eligible for, it is an underpayment. Both overpayments and underpayments are termed improper payments. In order to continue receiving federal funding for their unemployment insurance programs, states are required to maintain an improper payment rate of less than 10 percent and a recovery rate of at least 68 percent.

Willfully misrepresenting or concealing relevant facts in order to get excess benefits is considered unemployment insurance fraud. The exact definition of fraud varies from state to state. Under federal law, states are required to impose a monetary penalty for unemployment fraud of at least 15 percent of the overpayment amount, although the penalty can be higher. Penalties for fraud can also include forfeiture of future benefits and criminal prosecution. Ignorance of the state's unemployment insurance laws may not be a valid defense against a claim of willful misrepresentation.

Under federal law, states have discretion to waive non-fraud overpayments. For regular state UI programs, states must assess each waiver application individually and cannot grant blanket waivers to broad groups of claims, even when the overpayments were all due to one systemic problem or agency error. However, the U.S. Department of Labor authorizes blanket waivers for certain categories of overpayments made under the three temporary federal programs that were created during the COVID-19 pandemic (FPUC, PEUC, and PUA). Different states waive different percentages of overpayments: for example, Texas waived 34 percent of overpayment cases between 2020 and November 2023, while New York forgave only 3 percent. States such as New York have been criticized for aggressively pursuing overpayments even when it would cause financial hardship, as well as issuing determinations of fraud for most overpayments even when there is scant evidence of intent.

== Special programs ==
=== Reemployment Services and Eligibility Assessment (RESEA) ===
Reemployment Services and Eligibility Assessment (RESEA) is a federally funded program with the aims of improving employment outcomes for claimants and of preventing and detecting overpayments.

=== Self-Employment Assistance ===
Five states (Delaware, Mississippi, New Hampshire, New York, and Oregon) have Self-Employment Assistance (SEA) programs, which allow claimants to work full-time on starting a new business while continuing to claim unemployment benefits. In order to be eligible, claimants must already be eligible for UI under their state's laws. If a claimant is not in a SEA program, starting or operating a business may be considered employment and thereby render that person ineligible for unemployment benefits, either on a continuous basis or for the duration of time (i.e. the number of hours or days) that they worked on the business.

== Temporary benefit extensions ==
=== Extended Benefits program ===
In 1970, the unemployment insurance program was amended by Congress to allow for automatic temporary extensions of benefit durations during high levels of state-level unemployment.

=== Temporary federal extensions ===
During national recessions, the federal government often extends unemployment insurance benefits temporarily as part of a broader countercyclical economic policy. This has occurred in 1958, 1961, 1971, 1974, 1982, 1991, 2002, 2008, and 2020.

The below table, based on research by the Congressional Research Service, summarizes the temporary extensions until 2008:

Program name	Dates	Extension duration
Temporary Unemployment Compensation (TUC)	June 1958 – June 1959	Lesser of 50% of regular entitlement or 13 weeks.
Temporary Extended Unemployment Compensation (TEUC)	April 1961 – March 1962	Lesser of 50% of regular entitlement or 13 weeks.
Emergency Unemployment Compensation (Magnuson Act)	January 1972 – March 1973	Lesser of 50% of regular entitlement or 13 weeks.
Federal Supplemental Benefits (FSB)	January 1975 – January 1978	Up to 26 weeks.
Federal Supplemental Compensation (FSC)	September 1982 – June 1985	Varied benefit tiers, ranging from 2 weeks to 16 weeks.
Emergency Unemployment Compensation (EUC)	November 1991 – April 1994	Varied benefit tiers, ranging from 6 weeks to 26 weeks. Superseded rather than supplemented the Extended Benefits program.
Temporary Extended Unemployment Compensation (TEUC, TEUC-X)	March 2002 – March 2004	Up to 13 weeks, and up to an additional 13 weeks in high-unemployment states.
Emergency Unemployment Compensation of 2008 (EUC08)	July 2008 – December 2013	Initially 13 weeks. Amended to create varied benefit tiers, with up to 53 additional weeks.

==== Great Recession (2008-2013) ====
During the Great Recession, the federal government passed the Supplemental Appropriations Act of 2008, the American Recovery and Reinvestment Act of 2009, and several amendments, which together created a major temporary expansion of unemployment insurance benefits called the Emergency Unemployment Compensation of 2008. The program initially extended benefits by 13 weeks. Unlike in previous recessions, the federal government also covered 100% of the cost of the automatic Extended Benefits program. Later amendments extended benefits further, using a tiered system, with state programs being eligible for a maximum of 53 additional weeks of benefit extensions based on state unemployment levels.

==== COVID-19 pandemic (2020-2021) ====
During the COVID-19 pandemic in 2020, the CARES Act created three programs that significantly expanded unemployment insurance benefits. The Federal Pandemic Unemployment Compensation (FPUC) increased the amount of benefits by $600 in addition to the normal amount allotted by state programs. This expired at the end of July, 2020, though was partially replaced by executive order of President Trump by money allocated to FEMA, for states that contribute matching funds. The Pandemic Emergency Unemployment Compensation (PEUC) extended benefit durations by 13 weeks for those who have otherwise exhausted benefits. The Pandemic Unemployment Assistance (PUA) expanded eligibility for unemployment insurance temporarily, extending it to any individual who is out of work due to the pandemic, including formerly self-employed, contract, and gig workers.

On August 8, 2020, President Donald Trump signed an executive order that provided $300 to $400 extra benefits per week. Under the order, the federal government provided $300 in additional unemployment using Federal Emergency Management Agency (FEMA) funds, and states were responsible for contributing the remaining $100. States were given the option to choose how they would pay the remaining $100 and decide if they would even pay it.

In the Consolidated Appropriations Act passed in December 2020, the federal government provided extra benefit payments of $300 per week for 11 weeks (through March 14, 2021). In January 2021, newly inaugurated President Joe Biden's administration announced a proposal that would further extend unemployment insurance with additional payments of $400 per week through September 2021. Under the American Rescue Plan passed in March 2021, extra benefit payments were increased to $400 per week and benefits were extended through September 6, 2021. While benefits are normally taxable, this law made the first $10,200 in unemployment benefits received in the fiscal year 2020 exempt from taxation. Starting in June 2021, over 20 states, mostly those with Republicans in control of state government, opted to end benefit or eligibility extensions earlier than required.

The surge of unemployment filings and eligibility changes during the pandemic created a massive backlog of claims. Unemployed people reported severe delays in contacting unemployment offices to resolve problems or to file non-traditional claims, with some being told to use Twitter or contact the governor to get problems resolved. Some people waited for several months to receive benefits after having been laid off. To better meet this substantial increase in claims and comply with federal fraud prevention requirements, states accelerated their plans for modernizing their unemployment insurance systems. Congress allocated $2 billion in the American Rescue Plan Act of 2021 to help states improve access to unemployment benefits, reduce payment delays, and combat fraud. Additionally, the U.S. Department of Labor announced in August 2021 that it was creating an Office of Unemployment Insurance Modernization to oversee this spending and assist states in updating their unemployment systems.

== Measurement ==
=== Current data ===
Each Thursday, the Department of Labor issues the Unemployment Insurance Weekly Claims Report. Its headline number is the seasonally adjusted estimate for initial unemployment claims filed during the previous week in the US. Since this statistic is published weekly, it is commonly depended on as a current indicator of the labor market and the economy generally.

In 2016, the number of people on unemployment benefits fell to around 2.14 million, the lowest in the last 4 decades. In April 2020, claims reached 40 million, a new all-time high.

=== Unemployment insurance outlook ===
Twice a year, the Office of Management and Budget delivers an economic assessment of the unemployment insurance program as it relates to budgetary issues. As it relates to the FY 2012 budget, the OMB reports that the insured unemployment rate (IUR) is projected to average 3.6% in both FY 2011 and in FY 2012. State unemployment regular benefit outlays are estimated at $61 billion in FY 2011 and $64.3 billion in FY 2012, down somewhat from Midsession estimates. Outlays from state trust fund accounts are projected to exceed revenues and interest income by $16.0 billion in FY 2011 and $15.1 billion in FY 2012. State trust fund account balances, net of loans, are projected to continue to fall, from -$27.4 billion at the end of FY 2010 to -$62.7 billion at the end of FY 2013, before starting to grow again.

Net balances are not projected to become positive again until well beyond FY 2016. Up to 40 states are projected to continue borrowing heavily from the Federal Unemployment Account (FUA) over the next few years. The aggregate loan balance is projected to increase from $40.2 billion at the end of FY 2010 to a peak end-of-year balance of $68.3 billion in FY 2013. Due to the high volume of state loans and increased EB payments, FUA and EUCA are projected to borrow $26.7 billion from the general fund in FY 2011 and an additional $19.4 billion in FY 2012, with neither account projected to return to a net positive balance before 2016. The general fund advances must be repaid with interest.

== Criticisms and reform proposals ==
=== Systemic racism ===
Advocates such as the National Employment Law Project (NELP) contend that the U.S. unemployment insurance system disproportionately excludes black workers and other workers of color. They point out that policymakers in the New Deal era made intentional compromises "to make the program appealing for the strong base of conservative white Southern Democrats who held the most powerful seats in Congress." In particular, agricultural and domestic workers, which comprised 65 percent of Black workers, were excluded from unemployment benefits.

=== Discouragement of work ===
Both left- and right-wing critics allege that the structure of unemployment insurance discourages people from returning to work. Under various state laws, claimants who work part-time or earn more than a certain threshold are barred from receiving unemployment benefits for a given week, creating a welfare trap that discourages workers from taking part-time jobs while looking for full-time work. To mitigate this issue, states apply an "earnings disregard" process by ignoring some portion of a worker's income and reducing their benefit payments based on their earnings above that amount. Since 2021, New York has allowed workers to claim "partial benefits" when they work 30 hours or fewer in a given week.

== See also ==
- Social programs in the United States
- Federal Unemployment Tax Act
- CARES Act
