= Emergency Unemployment Compensation Extension Act =

- Long title: To provide for the extension of certain unemployment benefits, and for other purposes.
- Announced in: the 113th United States Congress
- Sponsored by: Sen. Jack Reed (D, RI)
- Number of co-sponsors: 13

Codification
- Acts affected: Supplemental Appropriations Act, 2008, Emergency Unemployment Compensation Extension Act, Railroad Unemployment Insurance Act, Federal-State Extended Unemployment Compensation Act of 1970, American Taxpayer Relief Act of 2012, Assistance for Unemployed Workers and Struggling Families Act, Unemployment Compensation Extension Act of 2008
- U.S.C. sections affected: 26 U.S.C. § 3304, 45 U.S.C. § 352
- Agencies affected: Railroad Retirement Board

Legislative history
- Introduced in the Senate as S. 1845 by Sen. Jack Reed (D, RI) on December 17, 2013

The Emergency Unemployment Compensation Extension Act (S. 1845) is a bill that would extend the length of unemployment benefits to cover another three months, until March 31, 2014. The three-month extension would cost $6.4 billion.

The Emergency Unemployment Compensation Extension Act was introduced in the United States Senate during the 113th United States Congress.

== Background ==
In response to the Great Recession in the United States, the federal government began extending the length of unemployment benefits. The federal government has been providing additional weeks of unemployment benefits for people since 2008. The most recent extension was provided by the American Taxpayer Relief Act of 2012, which extended unemployment benefits until the end of 2013.

The United States Department of Labor's Bureau of Labor Statistics reports that the average (mean) duration of unemployment in weeks was 37.2 weeks in November 2013. The median duration was 17.0 weeks. 22.6% of people who were unemployed found a new job in less than 5 weeks, while 37.3% had been unemployed for 27 weeks or more.

== Provisions of the bill ==
This summary is based largely on the summary provided by the Congressional Research Service, a public domain source.

The Emergency Unemployment Compensation Extension Act would amend the Supplemental Appropriations Act, 2008 to extend emergency unemployment compensation (EUC) payments for eligible individuals to weeks of employment ending on or before April 1, 2014.

The bill would amend the Assistance for Unemployed Workers and Struggling Families Act to extend until March 31, 2014, requirements that federal payments to states cover 100% of EUC.

The bill would also amend the Unemployment Compensation Extension Act of 2008 to exempt weeks of unemployment between enactment of this Act and September 30, 2014, from the prohibition in the Federal-State Extended Unemployment Compensation Act of 1970 (FSEUCA of 1970) against federal matching payments to a state for the first week in an individual's eligibility period for which extended compensation or sharable regular compensation is paid if the state law provides for payment of regular compensation to an individual for his or her first week of otherwise compensable unemployment. (This would allow temporary federal matching for the first week of extended benefits for states with no waiting period.)

The bill would also amend the FSEUCA of 1970 to postpone similarly from December 31, 2013, to March 31, 2014, termination of the period during which a state may determine its "on" and "off" indicators according to specified temporary substitutions in its formula.

The bill would amend the Supplemental Appropriations Act, 2008 to appropriate funds out of the employment security administration account through the first quarter of FY2015 to assist states in providing reemployment and eligibility assessment activities.

The bill would amend the Railroad Unemployment Insurance Act to extend through March 31, 2014, the temporary increase in extended unemployment benefits.

The bill would make a change in application of a certain requirement (nonreduction rule) to a state that has: (1) entered a federal-state EUC agreement, under which the federal government would reimburse the state's unemployment compensation agency making EUC payments to individuals who have exhausted all rights to regular unemployment compensation under state or federal law and meet specified other criteria; and (2) enacted a law before December 1, 2013, that, upon taking effect, would violate the nonreduction rule.

(Under the nonreduction rule such an agreement does not apply with respect to a state whose method for computing regular unemployment compensation under state law has been modified to make the average weekly unemployment compensation benefit paid on or after June 2, 2010, less than what would have been paid before June 2, 2010.)

The bill would declare that the nonreduction rule shall not apply to a state which has enacted a law before December 1, 2013, that, upon taking effect, would violate the nonreduction rule. It would allow such a state, however, to enter into a subsequent federal-state EUC agreement on or after enactment of this Act if, taking into account this inapplicability of the nonreduction rule, it would otherwise meet the requirements for an EUC agreement. (This would allow such a subsequent EUC agreement to permit payment of less than the average weekly unemployment compensation benefit paid on or after June 2, 2010.)

== Congressional Budget Office report ==
This summary is based largely on the summary provided by the Congressional Budget Office, a public domain source.

S. 1845 would extend the Emergency Unemployment Compensation (EUC) program for three months—through March 31, 2014. The EUC program allows qualified states to provide up to 47 additional weeks of federally funded unemployment compensation to people who have exhausted their regular unemployment benefits. The total expected increase in the deficit would be $6,414,000,000 over 2014-2023.

== Procedural history ==
The Emergency Unemployment Compensation Extension Act was introduced in the United States Senate on December 17, 2013 by Sen. Jack Reed (D, RI). The bill began receiving floor consideration on January 6, 2014.

== Debate and discussion ==
One objection many Republicans had to the bill was that it did not include any spending cuts to offset the $6.4 billion cost of the bill.

The liberal public policy think tank the Center for American Progress supported the bill. According to the Center for American Progress, extending the emergency unemployment benefits would accomplish two things. First, it would prevent 3.1 million Americans from losing their benefits. Second, it would create 310,000 jobs in the next year (as a result of the spending of the 3.1 million Americans who would keep their benefits). This information is based on a report on Jobs and Unemployment from fellow liberal think tank the Economic Policy Institute.

Conservative policy advocacy organization Heritage Action opposed the bill and challenged some of the arguments made by organizations such as the Center for American Progress. According to Heritage Action, research has shown that increasing unemployment benefits actually results in "higher unemployment," "longer unemployment," and "ineffective stimulus."

== See also ==
- List of bills in the 113th United States Congress
- Unemployment benefits
- Unemployment in the United States
