= Socio-economic mobility in Canada =

Socio-economic mobility in Canada refers to the movement of Canadians from one social class or economic level to another, The data shows an increase in intergenerational social mobility, however it is argued that such trends have remained stable since the 1990s.

== Background ==
Data for mobility analyses are drawn primarily from the Canadian Mobility Survey and Statistics Canada

== See also ==
- Socio-economic mobility in the United States
