= Supplemental Appropriations Act, 2008 =

The Supplemental Appropriations Act, 2008 (Pub. L. 110–252 (text) (PDF), H.R. 2642), which was signed into law on June 30, 2008, is an Act of Congress that appropriated $250 billion for ongoing military operations and domestic programs. This law is an example of an Appropriation bill, a bill that grants the government permission to spend a certain amount of money.

== Overview ==
The law includes funding for:

- $162 billion for military operations in Iraq and Afghanistan into 2009.
- $63 billion over 10 years for improved veterans' education benefits, called the Post-9/11 Veterans Educational Assistance Act of 2008.
- $12.5 billion over two years for an additional 13 weeks of unemployment benefits.
- $2.7 billion to replenish disaster aid and relief funds after the June 2008 Midwest floods.
- Blocks of six new Medicaid rules that would have cut state funding by $10 billion over the next five years.
- $10.1 billion in other spending.
