= China shock =

Effect of Chinese exports on employment

The China shock (or China trade shock) is the impact of rising Chinese exports on manufacturing employment in the United States and Europe after China's accession to the World Trade Organization in 2001. Studies agreed that the China trade shock reduced U.S. manufacturing employment, although their estimates of the scale of the effect range from 550,000 (explaining about 16% of the total decline in manufacturing employment in the U.S. between 2000 and 2007), through 1.8-2.0 million, to 2.0-2.4 million. Studies have also shown that there was "higher unemployment, lower labor force participation, and reduced wages in local labor markets" in U.S. regions that have industries that competed with Chinese industries. Losses in manufacturing employment have also been observed in Norway, Spain, Canada, and Germany.

A 2023 review of existing economic research concluded that US-China trade since the early 2000s caused aggregate welfare gains in both countries; had winners and losers in the US; and was not a leading cause of manufacturing employment decline in the US. Instead, economists note that the real harm of the China shock was in the rapid economic changes that came with it for communities and workers; research has found, however, that most of the US jobs and companies affected by the China Shock were in "late stage" industries already facing intense import competition and would therefore have eventually moved offshore regardless of the China shock.

Experts have argued that the China trade shock has ended: that in relation to consumer goods, the China shock largely ended by 2006 or 2007, while indicating that for capital goods the effects of Chinese imports to the United States continued up until 2012 and (in 2018) were ongoing in specific product categories. Some politicians have called for protectionism to reverse the China shock, but economists have expressed skepticism that protectionism will bring back manufacturing jobs en masse. Economists have also noted that extreme protectionist measures risk repeating the harms of the China shock by causing rapid economic change for the worse.

In the 2020s, a "China Shock 2.0" was characterized by a surge in exports, primarily to the European Union, of low-carbon economy goods, led by electric vehicles, as well as photovoltaics, wind turbines, home and electric vehicle batteries. Additionally, an "America Shock", derived from the "China Shock" term and stemming largely from the hostilities from the second Trump administration towards Europe, refers to the dual threats to Europe from dependence on US military and digital technologies as well as competition on the latter front.

In 2025, the Financial Times reported that China was experiencing its own form of a China shock, as employment in labor-intensive manufacturing was declining, as firms were increasingly opting for automation or shifting their manufacturing to countries with cheaper labor, such as Vietnam and Indonesia.

== Background ==
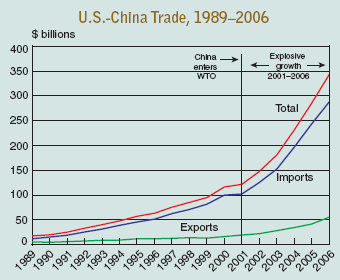
In the early 2000s, China was granted "Most favoured nation" (MFN) status by the World Trade Organization (WTO)

In 1991, China only accounted for 1% of total imports to the United States. Innovations in communications and transportation technology in the 1990s made it easier for firms to offshore production to low-wage countries such as China. China's accession to the WTO meant that it had to liberalize its economy, and reduce state interference, which boosted the efficiency of Chinese exporters. As China already had "Most favoured nation" (MFN) status since the 1980s in Europe and the United States, WTO accession did not lead to lower trade barriers. However, China's MFN status had been subject to annual approval by Congress in the United States; research has suggested that this caused uncertainty, and discouraged China-U.S. trade.

Economists David Autor, David Dorn and Gordon H. Hanson, who have extensively studied U.S. labor markets adjustments to trade competition shocks caused by China, supported the Trans-Pacific Partnership. Autor, Dorn and Hanson argue the adoption of the TPP "would promote trade in knowledge-intensive services in which U.S. companies exert a strong comparative advantage" and pressure China to raise regulatory rules and standards to those of TPP members, while "killing the TPP would do little" to bring manufacturing back to the United States.

== Economic impact ==
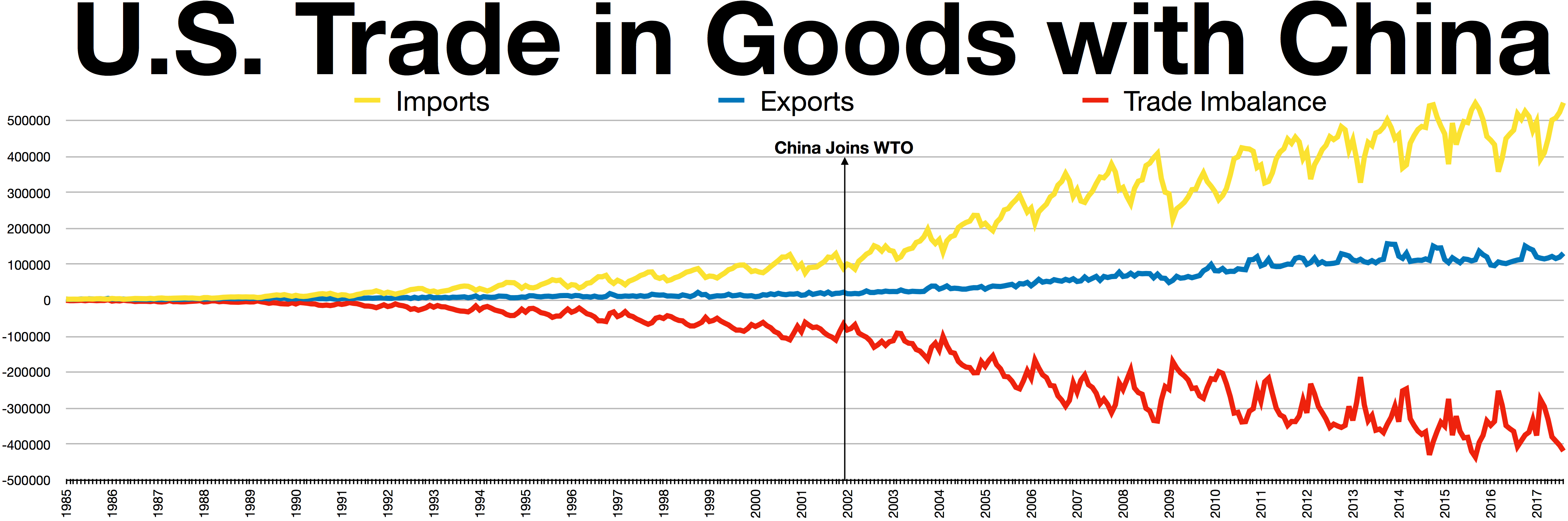
U.S. trade in goods with China (1985 - 2017).

Studies have shown that while some markets in the United States suffered adverse welfare and labor impacts, American trade led to net gains in employment and welfare over the period 1991–2011. These claims have been disputed by economists David Autor, David Dorn and Gordon Hanson, who state that "at the national level, employment has fallen in the US industries more exposed to import competition, as expected, but offsetting employment gains in other industries have yet to materialize." Although Autor, Dorn, and Hanson have documented the adverse effects of Chinese import competition on certain U.S. regions, they have emphasized that these findings reflect the broader impact of economic disruptions, including technological change and recessions, rather than trade alone. They do not dispute the overall economic benefits of free trade. Instead of advocating protectionist measures like tariffs, the authors argue that policy responses should focus on helping workers adapt to change.

Several empirical studies have challenged or nuanced the conclusions of the influential "China Shock" literature by David Autor, David Dorn, and Gordon Hanson, which attributes significant U.S. manufacturing job losses to rising Chinese import competition.

A general equilibrium model by Caliendo, Dvorkin, and Parro (2019) estimated that only around 15 percent of manufacturing job losses between 2000 and 2007 were attributable to the China Shock. Their analysis also found compensating gains in other sectors and regions, suggesting a more limited overall national impact.

Clément de Chaisemartin and Ziteng Lei (2023) identified a methodological flaw in the original 2013 Autor-Dorn-Hanson paper and found that, under a more robust empirical approach, Chinese imports did not cause statistically significant declines in U.S. manufacturing employment.

Other studies questioned the role of U.S. policy decisions such as the granting of permanent normal trade relations (PNTR) to China in 2000. George Alessandria and colleagues argued that the uncertainty surrounding China's trade status had already faded by the late 1990s, meaning PNTR had little practical effect on import flows. Similarly, Handley and Limão (2017) found that PNTR-induced policy certainty accounted for only one-third of Chinese export growth to the United States, with the remainder driven by China's own domestic reforms.

Mary Amiti et al. (2020) attributed around two-thirds of the U.S. manufacturing response to China's WTO accession to China's own tariff reductions, rather than U.S. trade liberalization. This view is supported by Zhi Wang and colleagues (2018), who found that while Chinese imports did lead to localized job losses, the aggregate effect on U.S. employment and wages was positive when supply-chain linkages were taken into account.

The consumer benefits of Chinese imports have also been emphasized. Xavier Jaravel and Erick Sager (2019) estimated that a one-percentage-point increase in imports from China reduced U.S. consumer prices by nearly two percentage points, leading to an average savings of $411,000 per lost manufacturing job — benefiting especially low- and middle-income households.

In a 2021 reassessment, Autor, Dorn, and Hanson themselves acknowledged these consumer benefits and revised their earlier conclusions. They found that once gains from lower prices were included, only about 6.3 percent of the U.S. population experienced net losses from Chinese import competition.

Further criticism has focused on the use of China Shock findings to justify protectionism. Jakubik and Stolzenburg (2021) revisit the China shock using value-added trade, finding that gross trade measures overstate China’s contribution to U.S. manufacturing job losses by about 32 percent and misallocate its geographic incidence, and that the economic adjustment process has largely concluded.

Several authors, including Alan Reynolds, Philip Levy, and Charles Freeman, have emphasized that long-term factors such as automation, technological change, and global supply chains played a larger role in U.S. manufacturing decline than Chinese imports. They also noted that Chinese goods often displaced imports from other Asian countries, not domestic production.

Economist Douglas Irwin nuances the paper of Autor, Dorn and Hanson. According to Irwin the China shock was an exceptional and largely one-off event. It coincided with a large-scale shift of labor from agriculture to industry in China, combined with a growing working-age population. Irwin argues that such conditions are unlikely to be repeated, given the slowing pace of urbanization and the now-declining working-age population in China. Moreover, the rise in Chinese imports occurred during a period of falling unemployment in the U.S., which, according to Irwin, indicates that it was not the result of a general demand shortfall. The problem, he contends, lay more in the geographic concentration of manufacturing and the limited ability of workers to move between regions and sectors.

Irwin also points to other contributing factors behind the deterioration of the U.S. labor market in the 2000s, including the 2008 financial crisis and macroeconomic imbalances such as China's exceptionally high current account surplus. In his view, the China shock does not alter the broad economic consensus that free trade delivers substantial benefits, although it is acknowledged that certain regions or occupational groups can be adversely affected by trade liberalization. In this context, the China shock represents an extreme case. Additional research, including work by Rob Feenstra, highlights the consumer benefits of the China shock, particularly through lower prices that disproportionately benefited low-income households. Part of China's efficiency gains was also due to unilateral reductions in import tariffs on intermediate goods and raw materials, which made Chinese producers more competitive. This development was not the result of U.S. policy, but of internal reforms in China — reforms that Irwin considers positive.

A 2017 study found that Germany gained on net from trade with China and Eastern Europe. A 2023 study found that increased wealth in China as a result of trade liberalization boosted the American higher education sector, as more Chinese families sent their children to study at American universities and pay tuition.

A 2025 study in the Journal of Political Economy found that the China Shock lead to overall welfare gains in the United States, but that it had distributional consequences, as eighteen states saw welfare reduction due to the China Shock while a majority of states saw welfare gains.

== Political impact ==
Studies have linked the effects of the China shock to an increase in populism and a backlash against globalization. Studies have shown that British regions that were more exposed to Chinese import competition were more likely to vote for Brexit in the 2016 referendum. Exposure to the China shock has led to negative views of minorities, in particular among American whites and males.

Papers have found that the China shock has contributed to political polarization. One analysis also found that it contributed to Donald Trump's victory in the 2016 presidential election: "A counterfactual study of closely contested states suggests that Michigan, Wisconsin, and Pennsylvania would have elected the Democrat instead of the Republican candidate if, ceteris paribus, the growth in Chinese import penetration had been 50 percent lower than the actual growth during the period of analysis. The Democratic candidate would also have obtained a majority in the electoral college in this counterfactual scenario." A 2026 study found that employment losses in industrial hubs resulted in greater support for Republican candidates and greater support for populist candidates.

In Italy, surges in support for the Lega Nord in the 2010s have been observed in localities where textile mills were undercut by Chinese manufacturers.

== Social impact ==
A 2016 study found that exposure to Chinese import competition led to greater high school graduation rates in the United States. This is possibly because of lower wages and employment opportunities for individuals without high school degrees in regions that competed with China. Economist Samuel Hammond, the director of poverty and welfare policy for the Niskanen Center, has argued that the signing into law of Permanent Normal Trade Relations (PNTR) with China on October 10, 2000, and the subsequent accession of China to the WTO has had wide reaching social implications. He states that the "PNTR has been implicated in some of the most significant and distressing trends of American life in this century: millions of well-paying manufacturing jobs lost; declining family formation and rising deaths of despair; soaring real-estate prices and medieval levels of urban inequality; increased political polarization and populist movements, left and right; and faltering faith in the power of liberal democracy to respond to these and related challenges. To pin all this on a single trade agreement would be a step too far, of course. And yet the imprint of what's come to be known as the "China shock" can be seen on all these trends, either through its first-order effects, or its reverberations through the body politic."

According to two studies, trade-related job losses contribute to greater military enlistment in the United States.

== China Shock 2.0 ==
In the 2020s, Chinese exports, primarily to the European Union, surged again, dubbed "China Shock 2.0". The core of this new boom is the electric vehicle market, led by Chinese manufacturers such as BYD Auto, SAIC Motor, and Geely Auto. Other low-carbon economy goods boomed, including photovoltaics, wind turbines, home and electric vehicle batteries.

== America Shock ==
Beginning in 2025 with the inauguration of the second presidency of Donald Trump, Europe (primarily the European Union) faced major crises related to the United States' vow to decouple from Europe in security as well as its major developments in technology that, along with the China Shock 2.0, threaten to upend the European nations' innovations in military and digital technology. French historian François Godement coined the term "America Shock 1.0" and argued that it ran contemporaneous as a large-scale issue for Europe alongside China Shock 2.0. As a result, European policymakers had to grapple with the concept of technological sovereignty and competition with the United States.

== See also ==
- China and the World Trade Organization
- China Shock 2.0
