= America shock =

Effects of European dependencies on the United States' services

Since January 2025 with the return of US president Donald Trump under his second presidency, European nations, especially those of the European Union, came under pressure from the administration due to fears of overdependency on the US for military and digital infrastructures. Much of Europe and the United States were historically closely tied since the end of World War II, establishing a network in which the US integrated itself into the financial networks of the nations in exchange for economic development and created a security umbrella tying them together, although it also rejected the independence of European military networks from the US. Multiple factors caused by the Trump administration sparked shock from European leaders in terms of vulnerabilities from overdependencies, such as from isolationist or hostile speeches from US Secretary of Defense Pete Hegseth and vice president JD Vance, Trump's annexation threats against Greenland, and sanctions by the Trump administration on the International Criminal Court (ICC). The diplomatic hostilities from the Trump administration were part of a wider trend of unilateral authority and the rejection of international norms by Trump, with Vance, Secretary of State Marco Rubio, and Trump envoys Steve Witkoff and Jared Kushner sharing common goals of elevating American interests at the expense of European nations.

In response to fears that the Trump administration could withdraw from or choose to weaponize military and technological dependencies against the European Union, the EU's policymakers enacted policies that gradually and selectively reduced European dependence on the United States. This resulted in larger-scale investments by the EU on member states' defense programs and European digital services. The European Union has also been criticized for its slow pace in decoupling from the United States in digital services. The Trump administration had also reacted with hostility towards the EU for its economic programs for boosting its industrial capacities independent of the US.

== Background ==
After the end of World War II in 1945, the United States, once isolationist in foreign policy, was in a solid position to determine the future of a war-torn European continent. The Soviet Union, previously one of the Allies of World War II along with the US, the United Kingdom, and China, became a geopolitical rival of the former as it sought to support communist governments in Eastern Europe. The US, in response, used a containment policy and integrated itself into the development of western Europe through the Marshall Plan, creating rapid economic recovery and deepening relations between western European nations and the US. The diplomatic hostilities between the western and eastern blocs formed the Cold War. In 1949, the US, Canada, and 10 European nations formed a military alliance and defense pact called the The North Atlantic Treaty Organization (NATO), with other European members joining in later years; the Soviet Union and its eastern European allies responded by forming its own pact called the Warsaw Pact. European colonization gradually declined over the course of the 20th century in favor of the US and the Soviet Union. The Revolutions of 1989 saw the dissolution of communist regimes, and the Soviet Union dissolved in 1991 with several countries splitting off from what became Russia. The strong relations between European nations and the US had been tied to the ideology of "Atlanticism", defined traditionally by close military ties and shared interests in security and rule of "western" values (i.e. democracy, individual rights). However, relations between the US and European nations had repeatedly been under periods of tension, notably over international organizations and treaties in the 21st century under the presidency of George W. Bush.

After the end of the Cold War, European foreign policy generally revolved around "borderless globalization", an idealized future for global society where global powers left their geopolitical ambitions behind in favor of multilateralism. The first shock against the idealism was the 2022 Russian invasion of Ukraine under Russian president Vladimir Putin as part of the Russo-Ukrainian war, in which Europeans realized that the nation's government rejected the ideology in favor of expansionism. The surprise invasion followed by European sanctions on Russia brought about a "Russia shock" that significantly disrupted European trade and exposed vulnerability in global markets.

Since the inauguration of the second presidency of Donald Trump in the United States in January 2025, Trump and his administration have both engaged with open hostility towards Europe and multilateralism in general. The deteriorating relations between the United States and European nations like those of the European Union are part of a wider trend of a radical departure of the the second Trump administration's foreign policy from traditional US foreign policies. The second Trump administration is described as wielding unilateral executive authority frequently at the cost of congressional checks on it, pursuing a "might makes right" model including in implementing sweeping tariffs globally and using military force against other countries. The administration had usually rejected traditional US alliances with other nations, sparking concerns that US credibility on the world stage had been weakened. The Trump administration had also aggressively pursued an expansionist policy, promoting escalatory rhetoric of annexations of other territories like the Panama Canal, Greenland, and Canada, posing a security threat alongside Russia against Europe. The first Trump administration's foreign policy was also unilateral, isolationist, and protectionist in nature, with arguments that the presidency had weakened international organizations and damaged US relations with its allies.

== Vulnerabilities in dependencies ==
French historian François Godement coined the term "America Shock 1.0" in reference to the "China shock" events that had twice economically and socially impacted Europe and the US, stating that the US' deep technological advances compared to its European counterparts, combined with diplomatic tensions between the European Union and the US, brought about significant economic and social challenges to the latter and led to Europeans increasingly interpreting the US as a geopolitical adversary.

=== Military ===
After the initial shock from Russia's full-scale war against Ukraine, the European Union was impacted by a second geopolitical shock from the United States begun by members of the Trump administration at the 61st Munich Security Conference in February 2025. On 12 February, US Secretary of Defense Pete Hegseth gave a speech declaring that Europe had to bear responsibility for the war in Ukraine and increase their defense budgets under NATO to 5% total for each of the countries based on their respective GDPs. He also stated that the US intended to shift towards Indo-Pacific security to counter China, therefore deprioritizing the European continent's security. Two days later on 14 February, US vice president JD Vance gave a speech that was interpreted by Europeans as hostile for his declaration that the biggest threat to the European continent was from "within" by supposed censorships of right-wing viewpoints. Vance's speech brought shock to European spectators, who interpreted the aftermath as the beginning of the end of Atlanticism. Trump's annexation threats against Greenland had also raised concerns that he sought to dismantle the world order and was no longer committed to international alliances like NATO. The US National Security Strategy released in 2025 again brought shock among Europeans because of the reveal that Americans no longer saw military presence in Europe as self-beneficial. In January 2025, Poland's prime minister Donald Tusk warned that the European Union should not continue to rely on the US for its defense and instead boost its own. Andrius Kubilius, the European Commissioner for Defense and Space, argued in December 2025 that the security strategy documents were why Europe needed to build its own defense and geopolitical independence quickly from the US.

Historically, European nations had been very dependent on a security umbrella from the United States as part of NATO, and the US itself was long staunchly opposed to Europe organizing defense by itself. Different Trump administration interests under the likes of JD Vance, US Secretary of State Marco Rubio, and Trump's envoys Steve Witkoff and Jared Kushner had been unified by elevating American geopolitical and economic motives at the expense of the sovereignties and economies of European nations. According to Bruegel, Europe had drastically increased its purchases from the US military industrial complex for four years up to 2025, thus making it overly dependent on it to the point that the US can weaponize the dependencies as leverage such as on trade. For instance, the 2025 EU-U.S. trade agreement, which after the Liberation Day tariffs by Trump was signed with the condition that the EU accept 15% tariffs from the US, was argued by European politicians to have been the result of its lack of self-sufficiency in its military defense. In addition, large US military weapon imports to the EU appear to imply that European domestic manufacturers are too weak and small in comparison and may lose out in job capacity and innovations in response to lack of support towards it and overdependency by Europe towards foreign nations such as the US. Beginning in March 2025, EU leaders proposed a boost of its defense spending via a reform of its overall fiscal policies, although they still feared high amounts of vulnerability if they were unable to rely on the US. In October 2026, the European Commission of the EU agreed to boosting the continent's own defense capacities under the European Defence Industry Programme using a €168.2 million allocation. However, the United States Department of Defense threatened to retaliate against the EU if it decided to favor its own defense capacities at the expense of American arms manufacturers' access to EU markets.

=== Digital technology ===
In addition to Trump's threats against Greenland and Vance's 2025 Munich speech, Europe's leadership was also alarmed by sanctions on the International Criminal Court (ICC) by the Trump administration in direct response to the 2024 arrest warrants for Israeli leaders for war crimes committed by Israel during the Gaza war. The sanctions, targeting specific individuals at the ICC and therefore disrupting digital services from the US, demonstrated to policymakers that the continent was too vulnerable to weaponization of technological dependencies from foreign nations, especially from the US. In response to the sanctions and fears of "kill switches" that could theoretically shut off digital services instantly, European governments and institutions had enacted policies for decoupling from the United States' digital platforms in favor of their own. A 2025 report found that the EU's dependency on the US for digital technology and other services is demonstrated by 80% of digital infrastructure in Europe being provided by non-EU services and that in 2022, two-thirds of Eurozone card transactions were from Visa and Mastercard. The European Council on Foreign Relations suggested that a theoretical scenario is that the United States could decide to restrict critical technologies like cloud infrastructure, phone operating systems, artificial intelligence, and social media in the European Union as coercive leverage, a practice that had been partially done under Trump and even his predecessor Joe Biden. In December 2025, Rubio placed a visa ban on the former EU market commissioner Thierry Breton along with four European digital activists for whom he claimed to have enacted "anti-American" sentiment and coercion of American services.

The Parliament Magazine argued that the EU had fallen behind the US and China in digital technological advances like AI and proved to be vulnerable to excessive dependencies on US tech, as was the case when an Amazon Web Services outage throughout Europe in October 2025 raised questions among policymakers about the heavy reliance on American providers. The Center for European Policy Analysis (CEPA) criticized European efforts to decouple from the United States as "half-hearted" and said that regulations by European law towards US technological firms had been interpreted by Washington as geopolitical hostilities. It made the case that the European continent had a viable and adaptable industrial base that needed a united and organized strategic autonomy.

The MEP Axel Voss said that to reduce Europe's status as a "digital colony" of the US, it should aim to reduce dependencies on US digital services from 80% to 40% by 2030. Fellow MEP Alexandra Geese agreed that the EU became a "digital colony" and that it must have independent digital technologies to be truly sovereign. EuroStack was created as a set of initiatives advocating for stronger funding and policies favoring technological developments in Europe to reduce dependencies on the US and is part of a broader "Buy European" vision. Some experts disagree with the approach, as AI expert Nicole Lemke said that European models did not need to be set on the global set and could instead just gradually phase out American models. Multiple European governments and institutions had enacted the processes of decoupling from the US in digital services. France on 31 January 2026 mandated that its ministries shift away from the American videoconference platforms Zoom and Microsoft Teams in favor of its own platform Visio by 2027. The Austrian Armed Forces and the German state of Schleswig-Holstein ordered shifts from Microsoft Windows and Microsoft Office to the European alternatives Linux and LibreOffice. The Norwegian Data Protection Authority (Datatilsynet) in Denmark issued warnings against its 51 municipalities in continued usage of Google products because of potential compliance risks. The European Union had also organized antitrust investigations against American digital services for violations of frameworks for them, punishing them with penalties like fines. Despite the efforts, European politicians criticized the slow pace of the EU's process of reducing the prominence of American digital infrastructures. In June 2026, the European Central Bank received parliamentary support in launching a "digital euro", an online and in-person payment for European customers as alternatives to American payment services like Visa and Mastercard in light of fears of the US under Trump weaponizing dependencies against them.

== See also ==
- China Shock 2.0
- Readiness 2030
- 2026 European unrest
