= Rafael Repullo =

Spanish economist

- Born: 1955 (age 70–71); Spain

Academic background
- Education: Universidad Complutense de Madrid; London School of Economics
- Doctoral advisor: Douglas Gale

Academic work
- Discipline: Economics
- Institutions: Center for Monetary and Financial Studies (CEMFI)
- Notable ideas: General equilibrium theory Banking; Corporate finance Incentive theory
- Awards: Eisenhower Fellow (1998); Fellow, Econometric Society (2002); Fellow, European Economic Association (2004); Rey Jaime I Award (2010); Fellow, Society for the Advancement of Economic Theory (2011); Member of the Academia Europaea (2020); Member, Royal Academy of Moral and Political Sciences (2024)
- Website: cemfi.es/~repullo

Rafael Repullo (born 1955) is a Spanish economist known for his contributions to general equilibrium theory, the theory of incentives, and the theory of banking and corporate finance. He is Professor of Economics at the Center for Monetary and Financial Studies (CEMFI), in Madrid, where he served as Director until 2023.

== Education and academic career ==
Repullo earned his Licenciatura en Ciencias Económicas from the Universidad Complutense de Madrid in 1976, graduating with the Premio Extraordinario. He pursued graduate studies at the London School of Economics (LSE), obtaining an M.Sc. in Econometrics and Mathematical Economics in 1980, awarded with a Mark of Distinction. He completed his Ph.D. in economics at LSE in 1984 under the supervision of Professor Douglas Gale.

He began his professional career in 1981 as lecturer in the Department of Economics at LSE before moving in 1985 to the Research Department of the Banco de España. In 1987, he joined CEMFI, a graduate school established by the Bank of Spain, as Professor of Economics and Director. He held the dual role until 2023, when he stepped down as Director and continued at CEMFI as Professor of Economics.

== Research ==
Repullo's research covers several areas in economics:

- General equilibrium theory – He has studied the existence and efficiency of equilibria in settings with transaction costs and incomplete markets. His work includes a seminal paper on the generic existence of equilibrium in incomplete markets.
- Theory of incentives and mechanism design – He co-authored papers with John Moore on the implementation of social choice rules in Nash equilibria and in subgame perfect Nash equilibria.
- Banking and corporate finance – His research has addressed venture capital, market liquidity, shareholder activism, insider trading, central bank lending, capital requirements, bank risk-taking, supervision, monetary policy transmission, and financial stability.

== Professional affiliations and service ==
Repullo has served as President of the Spanish Economic Association in 2016, Executive Vice-president of the Econometric Society from 2006 to 2012, member of the executive committee of both the Econometric Society and the European Economic Association, and Chair of the Scientific Council of the Toulouse School of Economics.

He is currently chair of the advisory board of the Financial Markets Group at the London School of Economics, a member of the Scientific Advisory Board of the Faculty of Business, Economics, and Statistics of the University of Vienna, and a member of the Academic Council of the Barcelona School of Economics.

Repullo has held visiting positions at central banks and academic institutions including the European Central Bank, the Federal Reserve Board, the Federal Reserve Bank of Minneapolis, and the Federal Reserve Bank of New York. He was a Houblon-Norman Fellow at the Bank of England and has held visiting academic posts at LSE, Tel Aviv University, Princeton University, Columbia University, and the University of Pennsylvania.

== Editorial work ==
Repullo has contributed to academic publishing as Co-Editor of the International Journal of Central Banking and Managing Editor of the Investigaciones Económicas. He has served on the editorial boards of the European Economic Review, the Journal of Banking and Finance, the Journal of the European Economic Association, and the Review of Economic Studies.

== Honours and awards ==
- Ely Devons Prize, London School of Economics (1980)
- Research Fellow, Centre for Economic Policy Research (1990)
- Eisenhower Fellow (1998)
- Founding member, European Corporate Governance Institute (2001)
- Fellow of the Econometric Society (2002)
- Fellow, European Economic Association (2004)
- Rey Jaime I Award in Economics (2010)
- Fellow, Spanish Economic Association (2011)
- Fellow, Society for the Advancement of Economic Theory (2011)
- Fellow, Finance Theory Group (2018)
- Member of the Academia Europaea, Section: Economics, Business and Management Sciences (2020)
- Member, Royal Academy of Moral and Political Sciences (2024)
- Honorary doctorate (Doctor Honoris Causa), University of Malaga (2025)
