= Javier Suárez =

Javier Suárez is the name of:

- Javier Suárez (cyclist), Colombian cyclist
- Javier Suárez (economist), Spanish economist
- Javier Suárez (footballer), Venezuelan footballer
