= Incentive (disambiguation) =

An incentive is something that motivates an individual to perform an action.

Incentive may also refer to:

- Incentive Software, a former British video game developer
- Incentive Records, in the music business
- "The Incentive", an episode of the American comedy television series The Office
- Incentivise, Australian thoroughbred racehorse

== See also ==
- Incentive theory (disambiguation)
