= Stéphane Bonhomme =

French economist (born 1976)

- Born: 2 November 1976 (age 49); Lyon, France

Academic background
- Education: Université Paris I Panthéon-Sorbonne

Academic work
- Discipline: Econometrics
- Institutions: University of Chicago
- Doctoral students: Elena Manresa
- Website: https://sites.google.com/site/stephanebonhommeresearch/

Stéphane Bonhomme is a French economist currently at the University of Chicago, where he is the Ann L. and Lawrence B. Buttenwieser Professor of Economics. Bonhomme specializes in microeconometrics. His research involves latent variable modeling, modeling of unobserved heterogeneity in panel data, and its applications in labor economics, in particular the analysis of earnings inequality and dynamics.

== Career ==
During his elementary education, Bonhomme attended the Conservatoire de Lyon where while acquiring basic education knowledge he simultaneously acquired music education with a focus on viola. Afterwards, he attended Lycee du Parc to prepare for entrance to the Grandes Écoles. He received his bachelor's degree and master’s degree in pure mathematics from École normale supérieure de Lyon.

His interest in politics led him to obtain the degree of political sciences from Sciences Po, Paris. Later, he studied at CREST and at Université Paris I. And, under the supervision of Jean-Marc Robin, Stéphane Bonhomme received his Ph.D. in economics from the Université Paris I Panthéon-Sorbonne.

He initiated his tenure track at the Center for Monetary and Financial Studies (CEMFI) in 2005. From 2009 to 2010, he was assistant professor at New York University. In 2010, he became professor at CEMFI, where he remained until 2013, when he joined The University of Chicago as professor in the Kenneth C. Griffin Department of Economics.

In parallel, he has held different editorial positions, including Managing Editor at the Review of Economic Studies (2011–2015), Co-editor of the Econometric Society Monograph Series (2018–2021), Associate Editor of the Journal of Econometrics (2018-2021), and member of the Editorial Board of the Journal of Economic Methods. Currently, he is the Editor of Quantitative Economics.

Since 2018, he is co-director of the Big Data Initiative at the Becker Friedman Institute for Research in Economics.

== Awards ==
From 2011 to 2015, he was awarded with a Starting Grant from the European Research Council.

In 2017, together with Thibaut Lamadon, he received a National Science Foundation (NSF) Grant.

In 2017, he was elected fellow of the Econometric Society, and in 2019, fellow of the International Association for Applied Econometrics.

== Work ==
Bonhomme’s contributions are both on the theory and empirical sides of econometrics.

=== Nonlinear panel models and unobserved heterogeneity ===
Bonhomme has developed several new approaches to estimating panel models with unobserved heterogeneity. He has characterized the class of prior distributions of individual effects that produce integrated-likelihood estimators of common parameters and average marginal effects which are first-order unbiased. He has developed a systematic “functional-differencing” method to construct moment restrictions on common parameters of likelihood models that are free from individual effects. These moment restrictions lead to method-of-moment estimators that are free from incidental-parameter bias in short panels. Bonhomme has also introduced a class of quantile regression (QR) estimators for short panels with random effects, which relies on a stochastic EM algorithm that alternates between draws of unobservables and QRs based on those draws. He has successfully applied this method to estimating nonlinear models of income and consumption.

Bonhomme has advocated for the use of clustering methods in panel data models to capture unobserved heterogeneity in parsimonious ways. In particular, his work combines k-means with a regression approach to estimate models with time-varying group patterns of heterogeneity. In recent work, he has put forward two-step grouped fixed-effects (GFE) estimators, where individuals are first classified into groups using k-means clustering, and the model is then estimated allowing for group-specific heterogeneity. In this work discrete heterogeneity is used as a dimension reduction tool rather than as an assumption about the real form of heterogeneity.

=== Earnings dynamics and inequality ===
Bonhomme has also contributed to better understanding the evolution of earnings inequality and mobility both in Spain and in France. His studies in the Spanish context have uncovered two key dimensions of this phenomenon: first, the cyclicality of inequality and, second, the inequality in the uncertainty about future income. Using Spanish Social Security data, his work documents that since the end of the 1980’s male inequality has been strongly countercyclical, partly reflecting the effects of the housing boom and bust on the construction sector. His more recent research proposes a method to measure individual income risk using administrative data and shows that income risk is highly unequal in Spain: more than half of the economy has close to perfect predictability of their income, while some face considerable uncertainty. Indeed, in Spain, income risk inequality amplifies income inequality, increases in downturns and has the most impact on the younger population. For France, his research documents whether and how much the equalizing force of earnings mobility changed in the 1990s. For this purpose, his study builds a model of earnings dynamics that combines a flexible modelling of the marginal distributions (inequality) with a tight parameterization of the dynamics (mobility). Estimating the model on the French Labor Force Survey, results show that earnings mobility decreases when cross-section inequality and unemployment risk increase. In addition, by simulating individual earnings trajectories and computing present values of lifetime earnings for various horizons, it is possible to calculate a natural measure of immobility or of the persistence of inequality as the ratio of inequality in present values to inequality in one-year earnings. That ratio remains remarkably constant over the business cycle in France.

=== Workers sorting and jobs attributes ===
Bonhomme’s applied work also extends to important questions in labor markets with heterogeneous workers and firms. His early work studies the estimation of compensating differential and their contribution to wage inequality in the presence of search frictions. More recently, Bonhomme and co-authors study non-linearities and mobility in employer-employee matched data using discrete classification of firms as a dimension reduction approach. This approach was applied to several countries, documenting a smaller than previously established role for employer specific contribution to wage inequalities. In his latest work, Bonhomme studies complementarities between workers within teams where he devises an identification argument and applies it to patent and academic publication.

=== Non-parametric identification of factor models and models with latent variables ===
Bonhomme has constructed estimators for linear factor models from panel data. One paper considers the estimation of factor loadings. The approach uses information in higher-order moments coupled with the assumption that factors are non-Gaussian. The constructed estimator builds on computational routines from the literature on signal processing. Another paper takes up nonparametric estimation of the full distribution of factors, generalizing previous work and providing a rigorous consistency result for a deconvolution estimator previously proposed in the literature.

In another series of papers, Bonhomme and co-authors have studied nonparametric estimation of multivariate models with discrete latent variables, including finite mixtures and hidden Markov models. Such models have a long history and are used in a variety of fields. The identification power of multivariate data, coupled with conditional-independence restrictions, was observed in previous literature. The work of Bonhomme and co-authors contains constructive proofs of identification based on multilinear restrictions and develops computationally-convenient estimators.

== Personal life ==
Bonhomme is married to Carmen Bello Gimeno, and has a daughter called Madeleine.

Bonhomme’s grandfather was Étienne Poitau, also known as “Capitaine Stéphane” who obtained Médaille de la Résistance and Chevalier de la Légion d’honneur. His grandfather’s activity as a member of the French Resistance during the German occupation was portrayed in two books: Paul Dreyfus, Stéphane, le capitaine à l’étoile verte; and in, Maréchaux Jacques, Ma Résistance dans la compagnie Stéphane: une jeunesse dans la tourmente.
