= Elena Manresa =

Spanish economist

Elena Manresa is a Spanish economist who works in the US as a professor of economics at Princeton University. Her specialty is econometrics, including microeconometrics and financial econometrics, especially focusing on heterogeneity in economic data.

== Education and career ==
Manresa studied mathematics as an undergraduate at the Polytechnic University of Catalonia, where she received a bachelor's degree in 2006. She continued her studies in economics and finance at CEMFI in Madrid, where she received a master's degree in 2008 and completed her Ph.D. in 2014. Her dissertation, Studies in the econometrics of panel data with applications to growth, social interactions and asset pricing, was jointly advised by Enrique Sentana and Stéphane Bonhomme.

She joined the MIT Sloan School of Management as an assistant professor in 2014, and moved to the New York University Department of Economics in 2017. There, she was promoted to associate professor in 2021. She moved again to Princeton University, as a full professor, in 2025.

== Recognition ==
Manresa became a Sloan Research Fellow in 2021. In 2022, she was awarded the 21st Banco Sabadell Foundation Award for Economic Research, given "for her research work in the field of microeconometrics and, especially, for her contribution to the analysis of panel data and its application to the study of social interactions". She became a Fellow of the Econometric Society in 2024.
