= David Dorn =

Swiss economist

- Born: 1979 (age 46–47); Zürich, Switzerland
- Education: University of St. Gallen
- Occupations: Economist, professor

David Dorn (born 1979) is a Swiss economist and currently the UBS Professor of Globalization and Labor Markets at the University of Zurich. His research focuses on the interplay between globalization and labour markets. In 2014, his research was awarded the Excellence Award in Global Economic Affairs by the Kiel Institute for the World Economy.

== Biography ==
David Dorn studied at the University of St. Gallen, where he earned M.Sc.s in economics and international management as well as a Ph.D. in economics in 2004 and 2009 respectively, and performed exchange terms at the ESADE Business School and the University of North Carolina at Chapel Hill. After his Ph.D., Dorn became an assistant professor at the CEMFI in Madrid, where he was promoted to associate professor in 2013. In 2014, he accepted a position as Professor of International Trade and Labor Markets at the University of Zurich, where he was promoted to the UBS Chair of Globalization and Labor Markets in 2019. Dorn has also held positions as visiting scholar or professor at the University of Chicago, Massachusetts Institute of Technology, Boston University and Harvard University. He maintains affiliations with the Centre for Economic Policy Research, CESifo, and the IZA Institute of Labor Economics. In terms of professional service, Dorn performs or has performed editorial duties at the Journal of the European Economic Association and the Review of Economic Studies.

== Research ==
David Dorn's research interests include labour markets, globalization, technological change and innovation, inequality and social polarization. Dorn ranks among the top 2% of economists registered on IDEAS/RePEc in terms of research output. He is a frequent co-author of David Autor (MIT).

=== Research on the relation between trade and labour markets ===
Dorn, David Autor and Gordon Hanson find that rising imports from China caused higher unemployment, lower labour force participation and reduced wages in local U.S. labour markets that house manufacturing industries that compete with those imports, explaining up to a quarter of the decline in U.S. manufacturing employment. At the individual level, persons who worked in 1991 in manufacturing industries in which imports from China grew strongly experienced lower aggregate earnings and change firms and industries more often, with churning particularly concentrated among those who had low initial wages, tenure or labour force attachment, while high-wage workers are much better able to adjust in case they are forced out of their jobs. More generally, job losses in the U.S. due to rising competition from Chinese imports over 1999-2011 were estimated by Dorn, Autor, Hanson, Daron Acemoglu and Brendan Price to amount to 2–2.4 million, with offsetting employment gains in other industries yet to materialize. Finally, while the impacts of trade with China grow in the 2000s as imports accelerate, labour markets in the U.S. with industries less exposed to Chinese trade but characterized by a high routine task content still experienced occupational polarization, first due to the automation of production activities in manufacturing and then due to the computerisation of information-processing tasks in non-manufacturing sectors. More recently, Dorn, Autor, Lawrence F. Katz, Christina Patterson and John van Reenen have connected the fall of the labour share in the U.S. to the rise of "superstar firms" by arguing that globalization and/or technological changes might advantage the most productive firms in each industry and that productivity is related to a low share of labour in firms' value added, resulting in industries becoming increasingly dominated by such "superstar firms" as well as in a falling aggregate labour share; they find empirical support for predictions based on this hypothesis.

=== Other research ===
- Dorn and Autor have argued that the polarization of U.S. employment and wages might be due to an interaction between consumer preferences favouring variety and the falling cost of routine job tasks, with local labour markets specializing in routine tasks adopting information technologies, reallocating low-skill labour into service occupations and experiencing earnings growth at the end of the wage distribution, and receiving inflows of skilled labour.
- Dorn and Autor observed that concentrations of routine employment in the U.S. in 1980-2005 tended to raise the share of workers employed in low-skill, non-routine jobs for all categories of workers but the youngest, with even college-educated older workers being increasingly found in such work.
- Dorn, Autor, Hanson and Kaveh Majlesi find that U.S. congressional districts that were exposed to stronger growth in import competition from China were disproportionately more likely to remove moderate representatives from office in the 2002 and 2010 congressional elections and more likely to support Republican presidential candidates.
- Dorn and Alfonso Sousa-Poza find that early retirement resulting from employment constraints is particularly widespread in Continental Europe, especially among countries facing economic recessions or strict employment protection legislation, and that generous retirement provisions make early retirement attractive for both employees and their employers.
- Dorn, Justina Fischer, Gebhard Kirchgässner and Alfonso Sousa-Poza find a positive relationship between democracy and happiness, especially in countries with an established democratic tradition, that is robust to variation in incomes, languages or religions.
