= China and the World Trade Organization =

Chinese participation in the WTO

China became a member of the World Trade Organization (WTO) on 11 December 2001, after the agreement of the Ministerial Conference of the WTO. The admission was preceded by a lengthy process of negotiations and required significant changes to the Chinese economy. Its membership has been contentious, with substantial economic and political effects on other countries (sometimes referred to as the China shock) and controversies over the mismatch between the WTO framework and China's economic model. Assessing and enforcing compliance have become issues in China-US trade relations, including how China's noncompliance creates benefits for its own economy.

== Background ==
Until the 1970s, China's economy was managed by the Chinese Communist Party (CCP) and was kept closed from other economies. Together with political reforms, China in the early 1980s began to open its economy and signed a number of regional trade agreements. China gained observer status with GATT and from 1986, began to work toward joining that organisation. China aimed to be included as a WTO founding member (which would validate it as a world economic power) but this attempt was thwarted because the United States, European countries, and Japan requested that China first reform various tariff policies, including tariff reductions, open markets and industrial policies.

The process was envisioned and endorsed by US President Bill Clinton, CCP General Secretary Jiang Zemin and Chinese Premier Zhu Rongji, without whose decade-long efforts it would have come to naught.

== Process of joining WTO ==
=== Preparations ===
Former Chinese President Jiang Zemin and Premier Zhu Rongji strongly supported China’s entry into the World Trade Organization (WTO), believing that accession was not only appropriate for a country of China’s size and economic potential, but would also serve as a catalyst for much-needed domestic reforms.

After the 1997 Asian financial crisis, China sold off or merged many unprofitable state-owned enterprises. Official data indicate that approximately 35 million SOE workers were laid off between 1995 and 2001—about 30 percent of the total SOE workforce—particularly during the major SOE restructuring of 1998, when China was preparing for WTO accession (Ministry of Human Resources and Social Security, 2006).

In 1998, China reformed the State Council to greatly reduce the mandate of the State Planning Commission and increase the mandate of the State Economic and Trade Commission. This shift also corresponded to the change in premiership from Li Peng to Zhu Rongji, the latter of whom strongly believed that China needed deeper economic restructuring. These reforms, which had been happening since the 1980s, included crackdowns on corruption and the establishment of chambers of commerce.

If the World Trade Organization Ministerial Conference of 1999 and related 1999 Seattle WTO protests were the penultimate step before Chinese accession, the May 2000 passage of permanent normal trade relations with China by the House of Representatives under Speaker Hastert was the crowning glory of Clintonian foreign policy. The Doha ministerial conference of November 2001 marked the ultimate step prior to China's accession.

=== United States' role ===
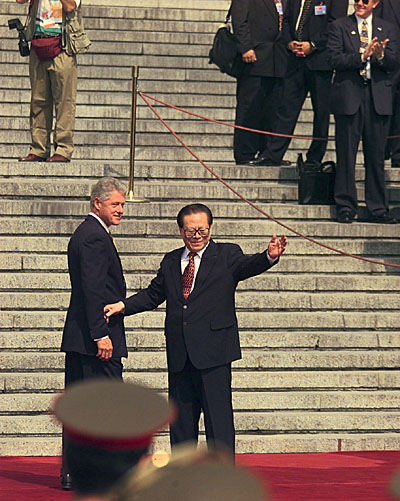
US President Bill Clinton and Chinese leader Jiang Zemin at the Great Hall of the People in Beijing on 27 June 1998

Formal diplomatic relations between the United States and the People's Republic of China were not established until 1979, and even afterward, trade relations were hampered by the high tariff rates of the Smoot–Hawley Tariff Act of 1930. After the two governments settled asset claims dating from the Korean War in 1950, Congress temporarily granted China most favored nation status in 1980. Chinese-American trade was still hindered by the Jackson–Vanik amendment of 1974, which made trade with the United States contingent on certain human rights metrics.

By 1984, the United States had become China's third-largest trading partner, while China ranked 14th among American trading partners. The annual renewal of China's MFN status was constantly challenged by anti-Chinese pressure groups during US congressional hearings. For example, U.S. imports from China almost doubled within five years, from $51.5 billion in 1996 to $102 billion in 2001. The American textile industry lobbied Congress for, and received, tariffs on Chinese textiles according to the WTO Agreement on Textiles and Clothing. In reaction to the 1989 Tiananmen Square protests' suppression, the Bush I administration and Congress imposed administrative and legal constraints on investment, exports, and other trade relations with China.

In advocating for China's accession, US policymakers articulated political and ideological expectations. President Bill Clinton argued that China's entry into the WTO would promote peace and reform, stating, "Today the House of Representatives has taken a historic step toward continued prosperity in America, reform in China, and peace in the world"; President George H. W. Bush had similarly stated that "no nation on Earth has discovered a way to import the world’s goods and services while stopping foreign ideas at the border," implying that greater trade openness would eventually lead to democratic development. (see: Democracy and economic growth; Democratic peace theory) However, these expectations are gravely challenged. According to the Council on Foreign Relations, WTO membership strengthened the Chinese Communist Party's control, with economic gains reinforcing its authoritarian model rather than encouraging political reform.

The Clinton presidency from 1992 started with an executive order (128590) that linked renewal of China's MFN status with seven human rights conditions, including "preservation of Tibetan indigenous religion and culture" and "access to prisons for international human rights organisations"—Clinton reversed this position a year later. Other challenges to Sino-American relations in this decade included the investigations into Chinese nuclear espionage which produced the Cox Report, the persecution of Taiwanese-American scientist Wen Ho Lee for unproven allegations of espionage for the PRC, and the 1999 United States bombing of the Chinese embassy in Belgrade. CCP General Secretary Jiang Zemin visited the USA from October 27 to November 3, 1997, and Clinton paid a return trip from June 25 to July 3, 1998. United States and China reached agreement on terms for China's entry into WTO after talks in Beijing in November 1999, subject to approval by Congress.

Relations warmed after the September 2001 initiation by George W. Bush of the war on terror.

=== Conditions ===
These changes were difficult steps for China and conflicted with its prior economic strategy. Accession meant that China would engage in global competition according to rules that it did not make. China's admission was "an enormous multilateral achievement" that marked a clear commitment toward multilateralism.

Under Article 15 of the protocol by which China joined the WTO, China was recognized as a Non-market economy (NME). This status allows special treatment within the WTO. The status was set for 15 years and has been disputed after 2016, the year when the 15 years had passed.

== History as a WTO member ==
=== China After Joining the WTO ===
WTO membership spurred Beijing to undertake a sweeping legislative and regulatory overhaul in order to bring domestic laws and policies into compliance with the international trading system. For example, it amended its law regulating the quality of products, with the aim of improving standards and strengthening the state's ability to guard against counterfeit and subpar goods.

It also revised its commodity inspection law to create a unified certification process for both foreign and domestic goods and put in place similar reforms for customs laws; rules governing pharmaceutical products; and copyright, patent, and trademarks laws.

In addition, China restructured key economic institutions to enhance regulatory capacity, merging multiple agencies to reduce bureaucratic overlap. The newly established General Administration of Quality Supervision, Inspection, and Quarantine (AQSIQ) reviewed more than 21,000 domestic technical standards, abolished approximately 1,400 of them, and revised over 9,000 others to bring China’s standards regime into compliance with WTO rules.

Beijing also created research and advisory centers across the country to provide guidance on WTO rules and procedures. A nationwide media campaign was launched to raise public awareness about the implications of WTO membership, and government officials received training to facilitate implementation of the organization’s rules.

China agreed to considerably harsher conditions than other developing countries. Furthermore, China had to deal with certain concerns linked to transparency and intellectual property that the accession to WTO underlined. It comprehensively amended its Trademark Law, Patent Law, and Copyright Law after it joined the World Trade Organization in 2001.

After its entry into the WTO in December 2001, China began pursuing export-led growth and became a key link in global supply chains. Chinese businesses were encouraged to trade directly with foreign companies (instead of working through state-owned enterprises as previously), with the exception of certain state monopoly sectors deemed critical to national security. After China's WTO admission, Chinese businesses had lower tariffs in foreign markets.

China's service sector was considerably liberalized and foreign investment was allowed; its restrictions on retail, wholesale and distribution ended. Banking, financial services, insurance and telecommunications in China were also opened up to foreign investment.

China's industrious and cheap labor also proved attractive to foreign investments. China accumulated large trade surpluses and foreign currency reserves, which greatly increased government resources.

In the 2000s, China was the world's largest exporter of rare earths; it sought to restrict exports and these policies resulted in major disruption to global supply and significant price increases. In response, the United States, European Union, and Japan brought a case against China in the World Trade Organization in 2012. They contended that China's export controls effectively subsidized downstream industries relying on rare earths (such as steel, photovoltaics, and semi-conductors) by keeping inputs low. The WTO ruled against China, determining that its export controls were not justifiable according to the exceptions that China had contended. China complied with the ruling, which also prompted increased policy coordination by central ministries and provided the impetus for further domestic reform.

In 2007, the U.S. brought a WTO case against China, challenging China's intellectual property laws. This resulted in China's further amendment of domestic IP laws to comply with the WTO panel's decision.

In 2024, the WTO stated that there is an "overall lack of transparency" in the Chinese government's financial subsidies for key industrial sectors.

On 24 September 2025, Chinese Premier Li Qiang announced that China will no longer request so-called Special and Differential Treatment (SDT) benefits, which arise from its developing country status, in WTO negotiations on future deals.

== Impact on US economy ==
- U.S. consumers broadly benefited from China’s WTO accession, as imports of lower-priced Chinese goods reduced overall consumer costs. In How Did China's WTO Entry Benefit U.S. Consumers? (NBER Working Paper No. 23487) Mary Amiti, Mi Dai, Robert C. Feenstra, and John Romalis find that U.S. imports of manufactured goods from China reduced the U.S. price index for manufactured goods by an estimated 7.6 percent between 2000 and 2006, due to China's entry into the World Trade Organization (WTO) in 2001.
- U.S. corporations also gained greater access to China’s massive market. By 2017, for example, Chinese consumers accounted for roughly 15 percent of Apple’s global sales, and since 2001, U.S. exports to China have increased by approximately 450 percent.
- (Downside) WTO accession also had distributional consequences. Between 1999 and 2011, nearly six million U.S. manufacturing jobs were lost. A landmark study attributed approximately one million of those manufacturing job losses—and 2.4 million total job losses—to increased import competition from China. At the same time, economists note that rapid technological change, particularly automation, also contributed significantly to manufacturing employment declines during this period.

== Impact on Chinese economy ==
- Between 1990 and 2015, the share of China’s population living in extreme poverty (defined as living on less than $1.90 per day) declined from 67 percent to under 1 percent.
- China’s economy is eleven times larger than it was in 2001. (as of 2025)
- Trade in goods between the United States and China increased from less than $100 billion in 1999 to $558 billion in 2019. China surpassed Germany to become the world’s largest exporter in 2009.

== Criticism toward China’s global trade ==
1. Dumping: China has been a subject of criticism for exporting goods at prices lower than their “normal value” in the domestic market.
2. State-Owned Enterprises: WTO rules contain limited provisions addressing state-owned enterprises, which remain central to China’s economic system. Many of these SOEs are promoted as "national champions," which are large-scale firms that are intended to have the ability to lead certain industries domestically and internationally. The United States has argued that subsidies to SOEs create unfair competitive advantages in global markets.
3. Developing countries status: Since joining the WTO in 2001, China has maintained developing-country status, which allows less differential treatment compared to other developing countries in its accession commitments. The United States has long argued China should give up the status because it is the world’s second largest economy. In 2025 China officially gave up its developing country status

== See also ==
- Reform and opening up
- China shock
- Trade policy of China
- China Society for World Trade Organization Studies
