= 2025 JD Vance speech at the Munich Security Conference =

2025 speech criticizing European leadership and policies

JD Vance speech at the 61st Munich Security Conference
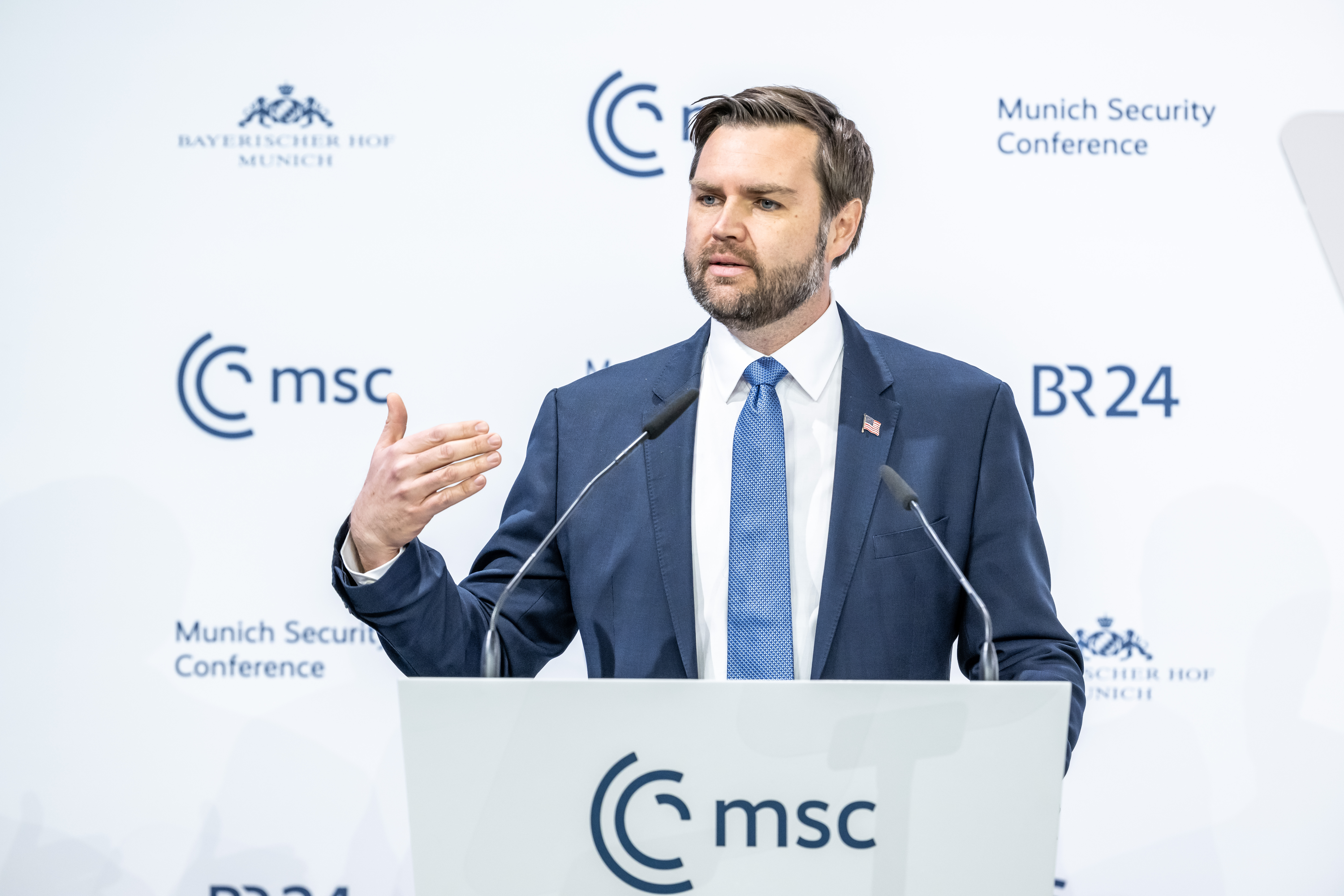
- Vance delivering his speech at the 61st Munich Security Conference
- Date: 14 February 2025; 20 months ago
- Venue: Hotel Bayerischer Hof
- Location: Munich, Germany
- Participants: JD Vance

On 14 February 2025, US vice president JD Vance delivered a speech at the 61st Munich Security Conference. In his speech, Vance argued that Europe's principal danger came from erosion of democratic norms—especially censorship, suppression of dissent, and exclusion of populist voices—rather than threats from Russia or China. He criticized European Union leaders for actions such as annulling Romania's presidential election under claims of foreign interference and using "misinformation" laws to silence political opposition. Vance warned that the US would condition its support for Europe on whether its governments actually uphold free speech, press freedom, and political legitimacy, and criticized European governments for "running in fear of their own voters".

His tone and content marked a sharp departure from past US foreign policy rhetoric and prompted strong pushback from European leaders. Several media outlets regarded the speech as a turning point in European Union–United States relations along with US president Donald Trump's telephone conversation with Russian president Vladimir Putin. Some described it as a declaration of "ideological war" and "culture war" against the United States' European allies, and a "wrecking ball" to the decades-long status quo of transatlantic relations.

== Background ==
The speech was delivered at the 61st Munich Security Conference, an annual conference on international security policy held in Munich, Germany. JD Vance, who had previously attended the conference as a US senator, delivered the address amid growing tensions over changes in US–European relations under the second Trump administration, and with regard to the Russian invasion of Ukraine, a political crisis in Romania and an economic crisis in Germany.

Just before the conference, US president Donald Trump held a telephone conversation with Russian president Vladimir Putin, which led to agreements on negotiations regarding the Russian invasion of Ukraine that appeared to leave out Ukraine and Europe as parties. This led foreign ministers of several European countries to say that the European Union must participate in the negotiations.

== Key points ==
Full video and audio of the speech as published by The White House

The speech was said by media outlets to focus on Vance's assertion that internal threats were the greatest dangers to European democracy, not external challenges from Russia or China. He said mass immigration was Europe's most significant problem, noting record levels of foreign-born residents in Germany and increased EU immigration from non-EU countries caused by "conscious decisions" from European leaders. Vance connected the vehicle-ramming attack by an Afghan immigrant on trade union demonstrators in Munich on the eve of the conference to the issue and argued for greater responsiveness to public concerns about migration.

=== Legitimacy of democratic institutions ===
In his speech, Vance said that European democratic institutions and rights to freedom of speech were being undermined. He specifically accused European politicians of cancelling elections, referring to the annulment of the first round of the 2024 Romanian presidential election, following reports of Russian internet and TikTok campaigns to promote the nationalist independent candidate Călin Georgescu, who had come first. He criticized European officials' approach to electoral integrity, arguing that democratic systems should be robust enough to withstand external influence attempts. Vance compared the annulment to Soviet-era practices, saying that "if your democracy can be destroyed with a few hundred thousand dollars of digital advertising from a foreign country, then it wasn't very strong to begin with". He said that the Romanian courts had decided to annul the elections under pressure from "flimsy suspicions of an intelligence agency and enormous pressure from its continental neighbors" in reference to the European Union. He specifically condemned "cavalier statements" made by former European Commissioner Thierry Breton, saying that he "sounded delighted that the Romanian government had just annulled an entire election" while on television.

=== Freedom of speech ===
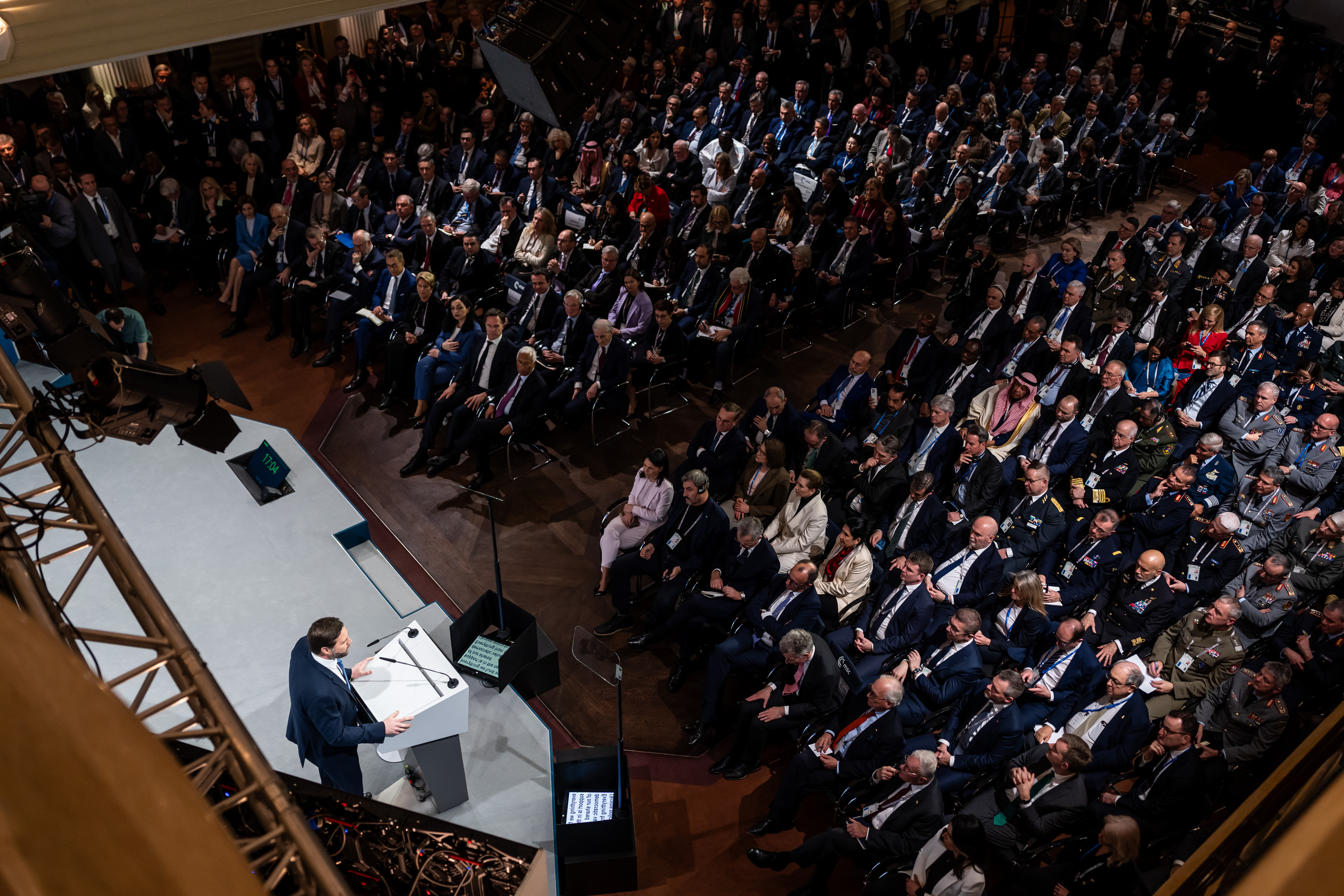
The speech was delivered by Vance to an audience of international policy leaders, defense officials, and diplomats.

Vance accused European leaders of using "ugly, Soviet-era words like misinformation and disinformation" in order to hide "old, entrenched interests" against alternative viewpoints that "might express a different opinion, or, God forbid, vote a different way—or even worse, win an election". The Vice President also heavily denounced the UK government for its "renegade" free speech laws, citing the example of Adam Smith Connor, who was jailed for breaching a "safe access zone" around an abortion clinic in Bournemouth. He also denounced Sweden's conviction of a Christian activist for burning a Quran as prosecution of religious expression, police crackdowns on anti-feminist comments in Germany, and warning letters sent by the Scottish government to people in Scotland whose homes were in safe access zones that allegedly outlawed private prayer. Throughout the address, Vance emphasized the importance of democratic legitimacy and popular sovereignty. He argued that European leaders should embrace rather than fear public opinion, even when it challenges established positions. The speech included specific criticism of the Munich Security Conference itself for excluding certain populist political leaders from participation.

On domestic American politics, Vance criticized former United States president Joe Biden for working with social media corporations to censor "misinformation," including his claim that COVID-19 possibly leaked from a lab in Wuhan. Vance assured that the Trump administration "will do precisely the opposite" of the Biden administration's alleged silencing of dissenting voices. He further said that "if American democracy can survive 10 years of Greta Thunberg scolding, you guys can survive a few months of Elon Musk" in reference to accusations of election interference against Musk for his promotion of Alternative for Germany (AfD).

=== European Union–United States relations ===
The speech addressed several aspects of US–EU relations, including defense spending and security cooperation. While affirming the Trump administration's commitment to European security, Vance emphasized the need for increased European defense contributions. He specifically mentioned the possibility of a "reasonable settlement" between Ukraine and Russia. He also criticized European rhetoric of framing Western attitudes towards Russia and Ukraine as a "defense of democracy" in contrast to his earlier examples of alleged infringements of democratic principles in Europe.

== Reactions ==
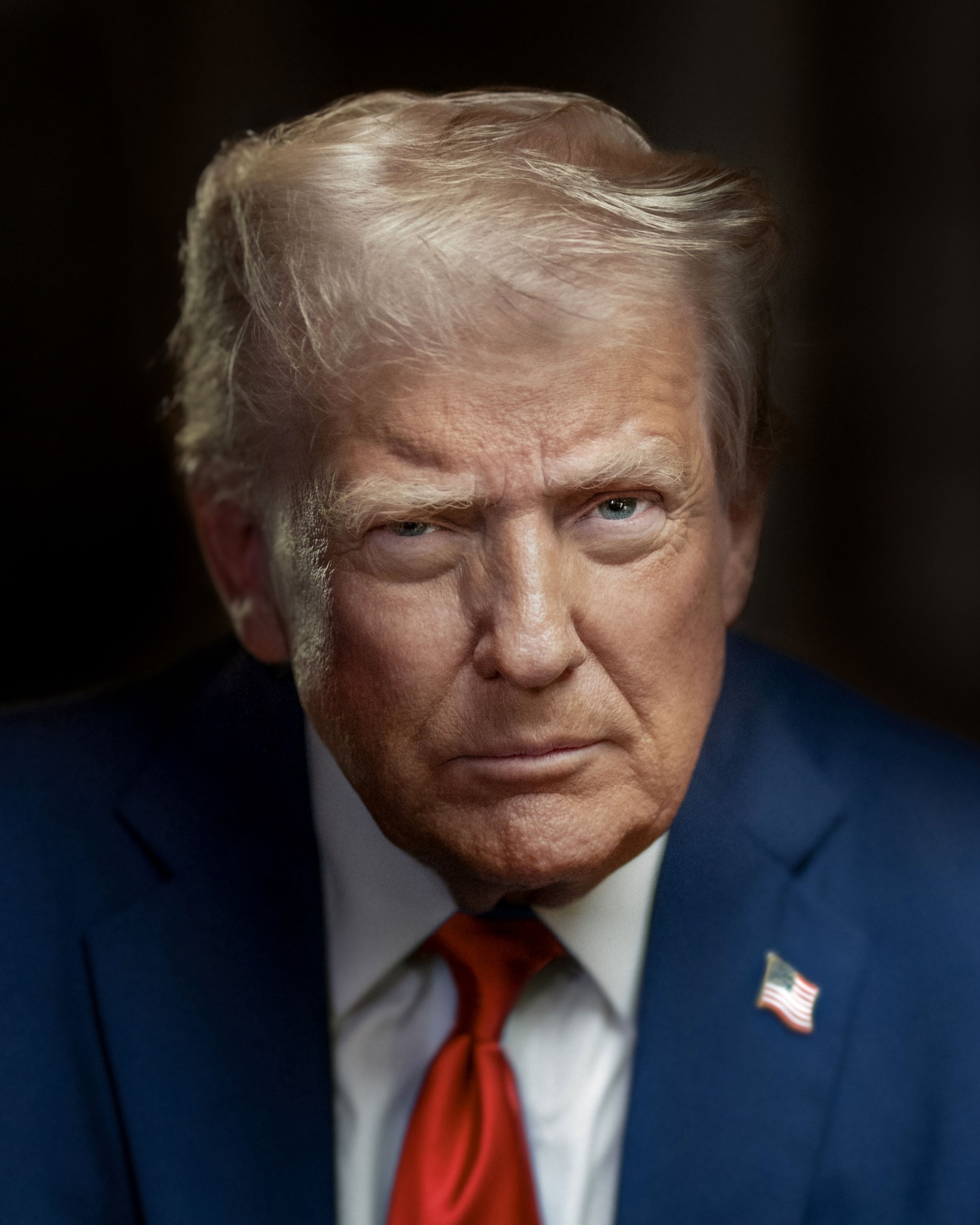
Donald Trump praised Vance's speech, arguing regarding Europe, "They're losing their wonderful right of freedom of speech."

CNN noted that most conference attendees who listened to Vance's speech "sat stony-faced," interrupting the vice president's speech with sparse and modest applause. Vance only briefly mentioned the Russia-Ukraine conflict, disappointing attendees who had hoped to learn more about the second Trump administration's plans for peace negotiations.

An unnamed Eastern European representative said that Vance's speech was the only topic other officials were discussing during the summit. Several United States and European diplomats and officials expressed dismay as the speech occurred, with one claiming that it led to "a room full of people with their mouth open". A former House Democratic member accused Vance of victim blaming Europe for its response to election interference by Russia, and claiming that Vance was also interfering with European elections.

John Cornyn, Republican Senator for Texas, expressed hope that the speech caused Europeans to realize that "their free ride on the coattails of America" had ended. An unnamed former senior United States diplomat described the speech as a "wake-up call" to Europe that it was not dealing with the same United States it was used to for decades.

Commenting on JD Vance's speech, German defense minister Boris Pistorius said that Vance's comparison of parts of Europe to authoritarian regimes was "not acceptable". The head of European Union diplomacy, Kaja Kallas, said that she had the feeling that the United States was "trying to pick a fight with us".

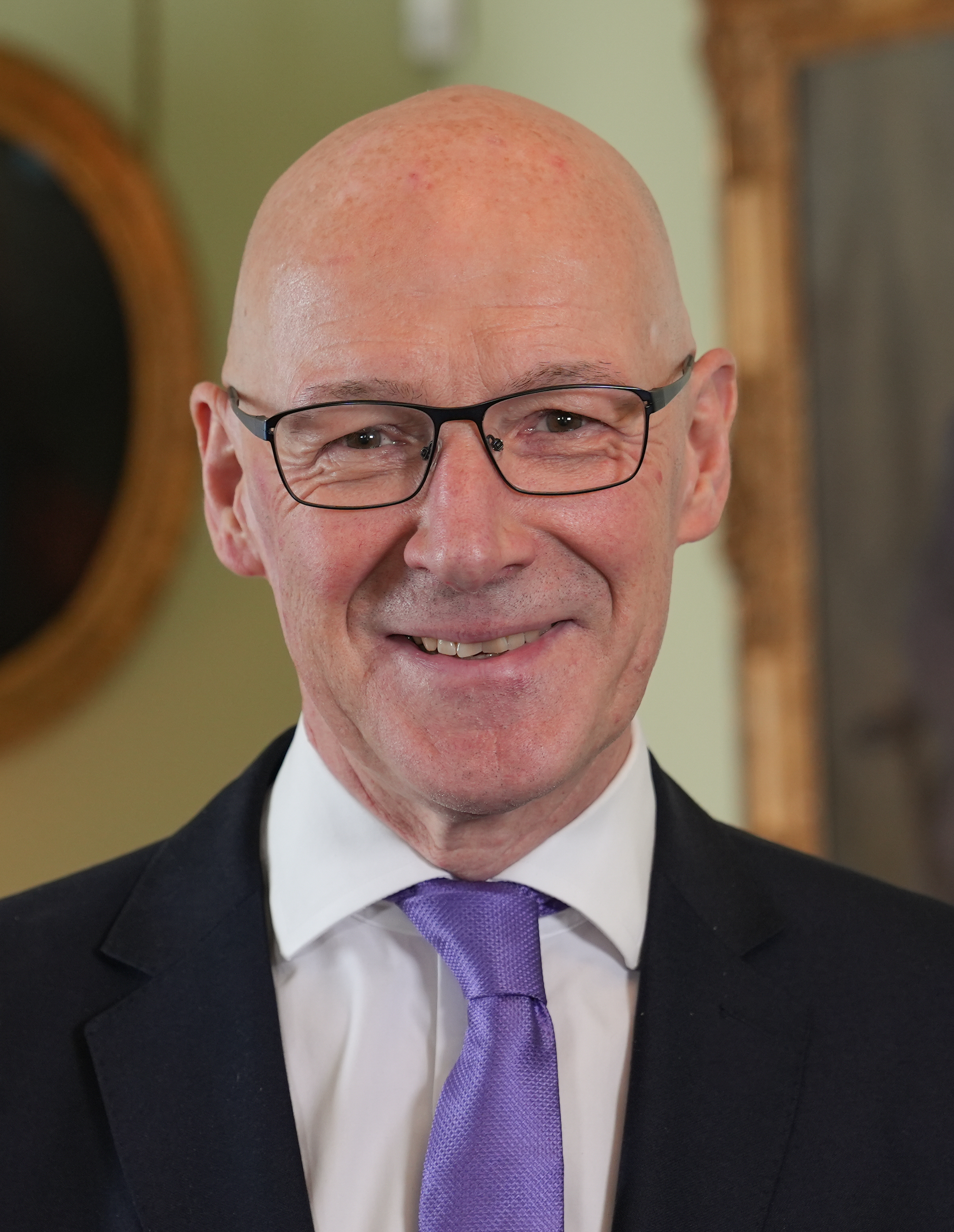
Scotland's first minister John Swinney claimed Vance "was wrong" in his comments regarding Scotland.

Swedish foreign minister Maria Malmer Stenergard declined to directly comment about Vance's mention of the Quran burning convictions. Former Swedish prime minister Carl Bildt called Vance's speech "significantly worse than expected", and accused Vance of "blatant interference in the [German] election campaign in favor of far-right AfD". Norwegian prime minister Jonas Gahr Støre said that while Vance could address whatever points he wished to at the summit, he disagreed that the "presumed" erosion of freedom of speech in Europe was more important than the ongoing security issues regarding Ukraine, Russia, and China.

Karin Keller-Sutter, president of the Swiss Confederation, called it "A liberal speech, very Swiss in a certain way".

Le Monde referred to Vance's speech as a declaration of "ideological war" against Europe. Politico described the speech as a "wrecking ball" to the summit, and having brought culture war to Europe. Writers in The Guardian fact checked elements of the speech and reported on multiple inaccuracies and misrepresentations.

In response to Vance's remarks about the Scottish Government's Safe Access Zones Act which was enacted in Scotland in September 2024, a spokesperson for the Scottish Government denounced Vance's claims, stating that "no letters had been sent out saying people couldn't pray in their homes", and that only "intentional or reckless behaviour" was covered by the Safe Access Zones Act. Member of the Scottish Parliament Gillian Mackay, who was responsible for drafting the law, claimed that Vance's remarks were "nonsense", and suggested that he was either "very badly informed" or "knowingly misrepresenting it". First Minister of Scotland John Swinney said that Vance "was wrong" about his comments, claiming that at "no such point was a letter put across to residents about private prayer in their own homes" as suggested by Vance.

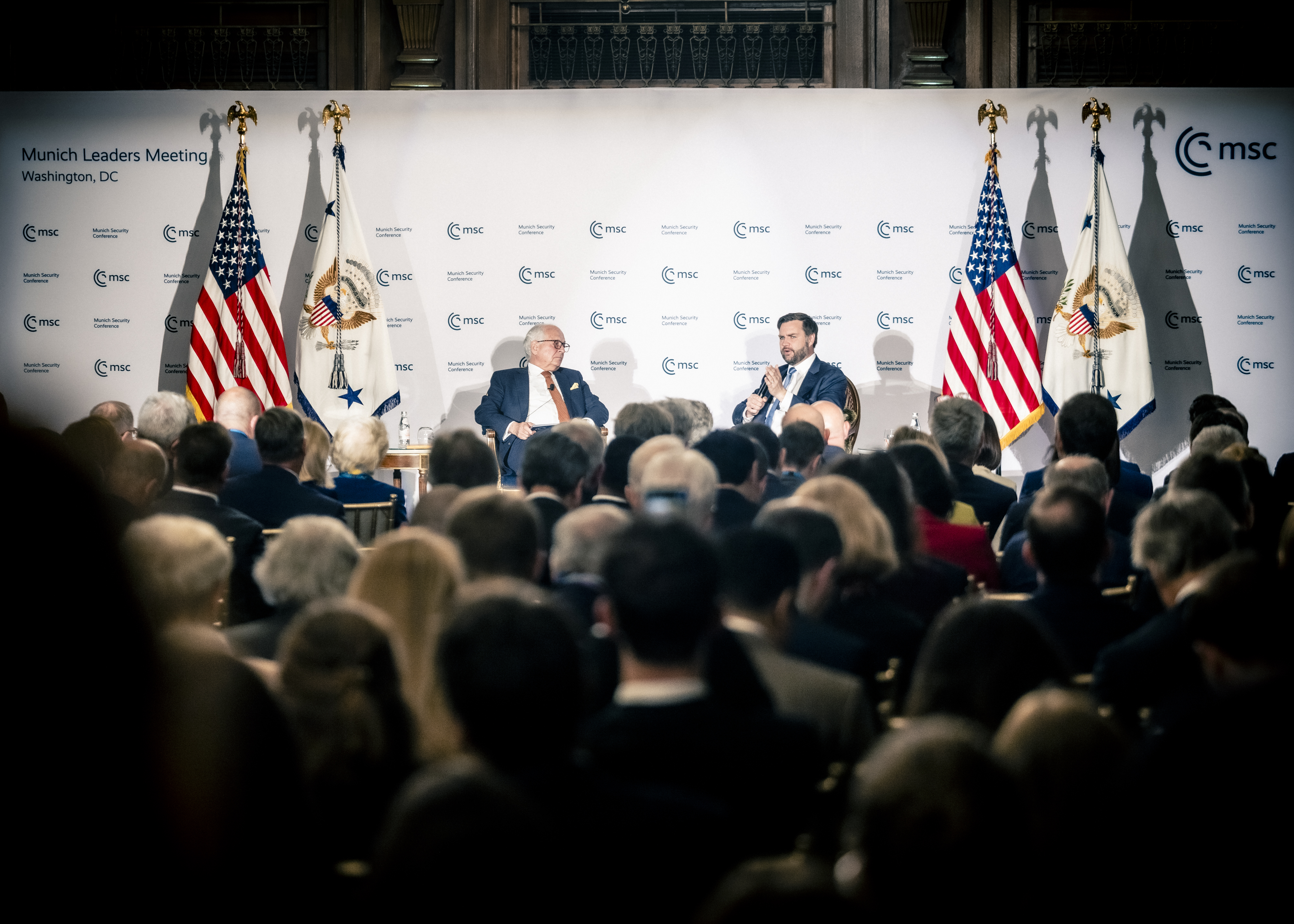
US Vice President JD Vance, participating in a Q&A session with Wolfgang Ischinger at the Munich Leaders Meeting in Washington, DC; May 7, 2025

Conservative The New York Times columnist Bret Stephens called the speech hypocritical and "a disgrace". Representative Alexandria Ocasio-Cortez, in a post on X addressing Vance, stated "[Y]ou lied to the world in Munich. If this administration believed in free speech as you claimed, its leaders wouldn't be threatening members of Congress with criminal investigations for educating the public of their Constitutional rights". Representative Gerry Connolly in an interview stated: "Imagine lecturing Europeans about being afraid of their own electorate when it is Trump and Elon Musk who are firing FBI agents because they dared to do their duty, who are having loyalty test at the National Security Council, who are firing tens of thousands of federal employees because they consider them part of the deep state and can't be trusted". Senator Andy Kim said he felt "embarrassed for America". Attorney Jonathan Turley praised the speech.

Mathias Döpfner, chief executive of Axel Springer, praised the speech as presenting an "inspiring message" and said many people had "intentionally misunderstood" it.

In a March 2025 interview with the Financial Times, Italian prime minister Giorgia Meloni (who belongs to the right-wing Brothers of Italy party) said that she agreed with Vance's speech, claiming that Europe "has a bit lost itself".

In May 2025, Munich Security Conference chairman Wolfgang Ischinger moderated the constructive Q&A session featuring Vice President Vance at the Munich Leaders Meeting in Washington, DC.

== See also ==
- America shock
- 2025 Trump–Zelenskyy meeting
- 2007 Munich speech of Vladimir Putin
- List of freedom indices
- Rhetoric of Donald Trump
- Trumpism
- Democratic backsliding by country – Europe
- 2025 National Security Strategy
