= China Shock 2.0 =

2020s rise in Chinese trade surplus

China Shock 2.0 is a term used by institutions and mass media to indicate the Chinese massive export shock in the 2020s, concerning electric cars and batteries, high tech products and advanced manufacturing.

== History ==
After the first Chinese shock of the 2000s, which was mainly caused by western companies manufacturing decentralization using low cost labor markets, in 2013 a new policy - the "Chinese Dream" - was issued by the new CCP general secretary Xi Jinping and Chinese Communist Party (CCP), focusing more on developing the internal market than simply manufacturing goods and exporting them.

China Shock 2.0 has been described as a next step after the Made in China 2025 policy into an 'industrial policy of everything' to further develop the manufacturing sector of China.

As a result of the election of Donald Trump as the president of the United States, a trade war began in 2018 and China was put under pressure for improving its efficiency in its internal goods and services production and export.

With the home market becoming also more and more competitive, since 2020-2021 a massive export surplus began to rise: from 2019 to 2025 the Chinese export surplus on the import increased from 16.9% to 31.5% and from 2% (2022) to 5% of the GDP. The overall Chinese trade surplus reached $1.2 trillion in 2025 and the term "China Shock 2.0" already began since 2024 to spread publicly.

In 2025, the 20th Central Committee of the CCP published the new 15th Five-Year Plan (2025-2030) that seems to show no intentions of slowing down the path, according to experts.

== See also ==
- 2020–2021 Xi Jinping administration reform spree
- Economy of China
- Electric vehicle industry in China
- China–European Union relations § Trade conflicts
- America shock
