= Mary Amiti =

Australian economist

Mary Amiti is an Australian economist and a vice president of the Microeconomic Studies Function at the Federal Reserve Bank of New York.

During her career, she worked at the World Bank, IMF and various universities before joining the Federal Reserve in 2006. She is a research associate at the CEPR.

== Education and career ==
Before obtaining her PhD, she worked as an Economic Analyst at the Australian Commonwealth Treasury from 1990 to 1991. She obtained her MSc and PhD from the London School of Economics in 1997 as well as a Bachelor in Economics from La Trobe University in Australia. Her doctoral thesis was titled International trade in the manufacturing sectors of industrialised countries: Theory and evidence.

She was then hired as an assistant professor at the Department of Economics in the Pompeu Fabra University in Spain. She then had various academic jobs at the La Trobe University and the University of Melbourne. In 2002, she was on sabbatical from Melbourne University and spent a year at the World Bank as a consultant. In 2005 she joined the IMF as a Senior Economist in the Trade and Investment Division. In 2006, she joined the Federal Reserve Bank of New York as a Senior Economist where she was promoted several times until obtaining her current post.

== Research ==
She is mainly focusing on International trade, International economics and Financial economics. Her works have been cited over 10000 times and she is ranked in the 1000 most cited economists according to IDEAS. Her research deal with questions of the impact of outsourcing, trade and tariffs.

Her research has been published in the Quarterly Journal of Economics, The American Economic Review, The Review of Economic Studies and the Journal of Political Economy.

== Selected bibliography ==
- Amiti, Mary; Konings, Jozef (2007). "Trade Liberalization, Intermediate Inputs, and Productivity: Evidence from Indonesia". American Economic Review. 97 (5): 1611–1638.
- Amiti, Mary; Weinstein, David E. (2011-11-01). "Exports and Financial Shocks". The Quarterly Journal of Economics. 126 (4): 1841–1877.
- Amiti, Mary; Davis, Donald R. (2012-01-01). "Trade, Firms, and Wages: Theory and Evidence". The Review of Economic Studies. 79 (1): 1–36.
- Amiti, Mary; Itskhoki, Oleg; Konings, Jozef (2014). "Importers, Exporters, and Exchange Rate Disconnect". American Economic Review. 104 (7): 1942–1978.
- Amiti, Mary; Weinstein, David E. (2018-04-01). "How Much Do Idiosyncratic Bank Shocks Affect Investment? Evidence from Matched Bank-Firm Loan Data". Journal of Political Economy. 126 (2): 525–587.
