= Javier Suárez (economist) =

Spanish economist (born 1966)

Javier Suárez Bernaldo de Quirós (born 1966, in Madrid) is a Spanish economist who is known for his specialization in financial crises.

He studied economics at the Complutense University of Madrid (Bachelor's degree, 1989) and Universidad Carlos III de Madrid and CEMFI (Doctorate, 1994)

He was a Postdoctoral fellow at the Harvard University (1994) and Lecturer in Economics at the London School of Economics (1994–1996).

He currently works as a professor at CEMFI (Centro de Estudios Monetarios y Financieros, Center for Monetary and Financial Studies), and collaborates with the Centre for Economic Policy Research (CEPR), with the European Corporate Governance Institute (ECGI), and with the Editorial Board of the Review of Finance.

== Partial bibliography ==
- "The need for an emergency bank debt insurance mechanism", CEPR Policy Insight 19, March 2008. (A summary of this piece appeared as VOX column 1013, 2008.)
- "Bringing money markets back to life", VOX column 2411, 2008.
- "Firms' stakeholders and the costs of transparency" (with A. Almazan and S. Titman), Journal of Economics and Management Strategy, 2008.
- "Social contacts and occupational choice" (with S. Bentolila and C. Michelacci), Economica, forthcoming. *"Financial distress, bankruptcy law, and the business cycle" (with O. Sussman), Annals of Finance, 3 (1) (2007), pp. 5–35.
- "Incomplete wage posting" (with C. Michelacci), Journal of Political Economy, 114 (6) (2006), pp. 1098–1123.
- "Loan pricing under Basel capital requirements" (with R. Repullo), Journal of Financial Intermediation, 13 (4) (2004), 496-521.
- "Venture capital finance: A security design approach" (with R. Repullo), Review of Finance, 8 (2004), 75-108.
- "Business creation and the stock market" (with C. Michelacci), Review of Economic Studies, 71 (2) (2004), 459-481.
- "Entrenchment and severance pay in optimal governance structures" (with A. Almazan), Journal of Finance, 58 (2) (2003), 519-548.
- "Managerial compensation and the market reaction to bank loans" (with A. Almazan), Review of Financial Studies, 16 (1) (2003), 237-261.
- "Last bank standing: What do I gain if you fail?" (with E. Perotti), European Economic Review, 46 (09) (2002), 1599-1622.
- "Entrepreneurial moral hazard and bank monitoring: A model of the credit channel" (with R. Repullo), European Economic Review, 44 (10) (2000), 1931-1950.
- "Financial distress and the business cycle" (with O. Sussman), Oxford Review of Economic Policy, 15 (3) (1999), 39-51.
- "Risk-taking and the prudential regulation of banks", Investigaciones Económicas, 22 (1998), 307-336. *"Monitoring, liquidation, and security design" (with R. Repullo), Review of Financial Studies, 11 (1998), 163-187. Reprinted in S. Bhattacharya, A. Boot, and A. Thakor (eds.), Credit, Intermediation, and the Macroeconomy, Oxford University Press, Oxford (2004).
- "Endogenous cycles in a Stiglitz-Weiss economy" (with O. Sussman), Journal of Economic Theory, 76 (1997), 47-71. Reprinted in B. Biais and M. Pagano (eds.), New Research in Corporate Finance and Banking, Oxford University Press, Oxford (2002).

== Awards and scholarships ==
- CEMFI MSc Scholarship (1989–1991)
- CEMFI Prize to the Best Student of the Class (1991)
- Pre-doctoral grant from the Spanish Ministry of Education (1992)
- Research grant from Fundación BBVA (1993).
- 5th Fundacion Banco Herrero Prize(2006).
