= David Autor =

American economist

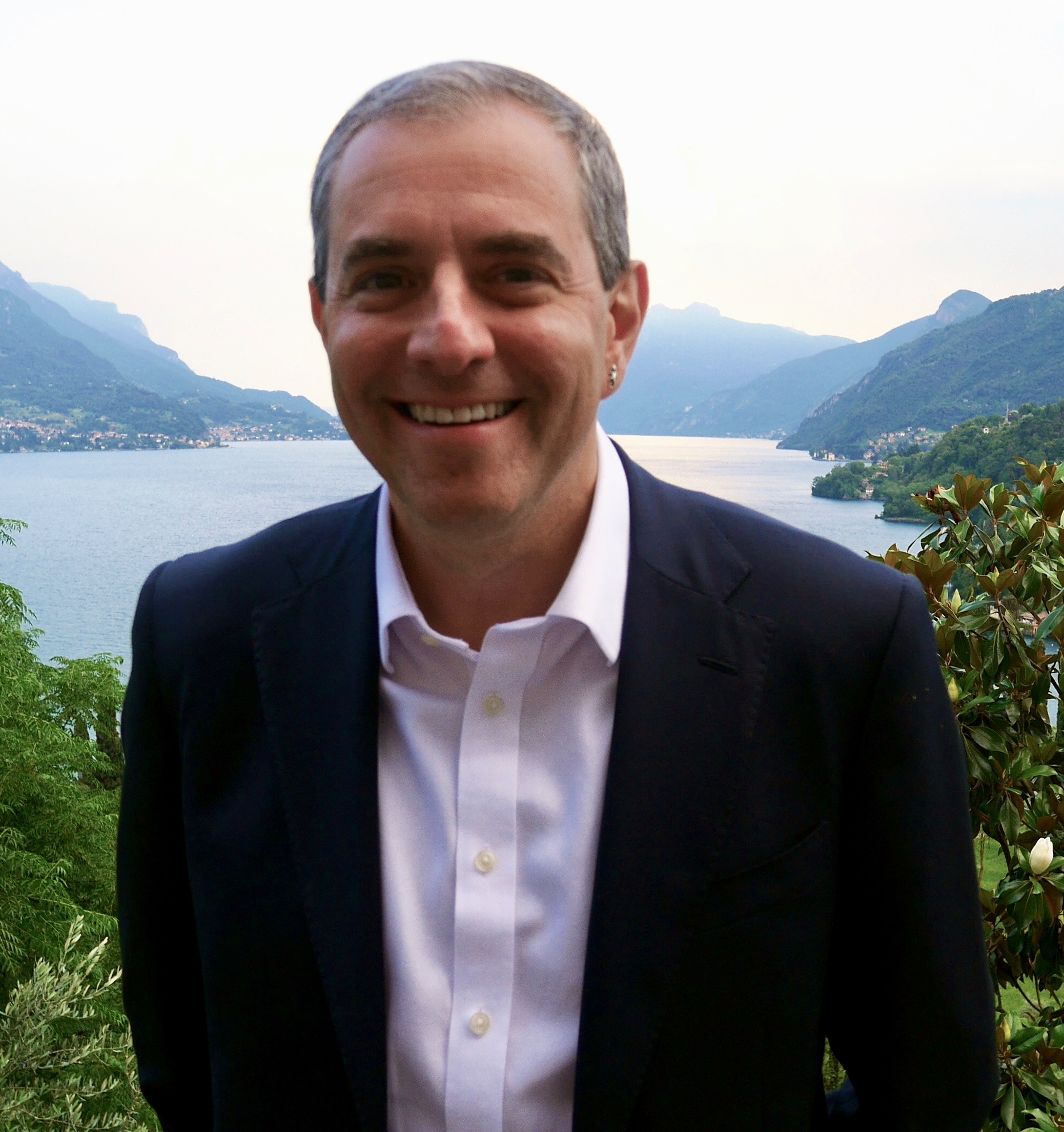
- Autor in 2016
- Born: 1967 (age 58–59)
- Spouse: Marika Tatsutani

Academic background
- Education: Tufts University (BA); Harvard University (MPP, PhD)
- Doctoral advisor: Lawrence F. Katz

Academic work
- Institutions: Massachusetts Institute of Technology
- Awards: NOMIS Distinguished Scientist and Scholar Award (2023); 25th Annual Heinz Awards (2020); Econometric Society (2014); American Academy of Arts and Sciences (2012); Alfred P. Sloan Fellowship (2003)
- Website: Information at IDEAS / RePEc

David H. Autor (born 1967) is an American economist, public policy scholar, and professor of economics at the Massachusetts Institute of Technology (MIT), where he is also head of the economics department and co-director of the School Effectiveness and Inequality Initiative. Although Autor has contributed to a variety of fields in economics, his research generally focuses on topics from labor economics.

== Early life and education ==
David Autor was raised in Newton, Massachusetts, by parents who were psychologists. He enrolled in Columbia University after high school, but dropped out and worked as an administrative assistant and software developer in a Boston hospital. He later returned to college, ultimately earning a B.A. in psychology from Tufts University in 1989. After graduating from Tufts, he pursued volunteer work at Glide Memorial Church in San Francisco that was teaching computer skills to disadvantaged students. In the Bay Area, Autor discovered his passion for economics and public policy and pursued an M.P.P. and Ph.D. in public policy from the John F. Kennedy School of Government (Harvard University), which he earned in 1994 and 1999 respectively.

== Academic career ==
After completing his Ph.D., David Autor was hired as assistant professor at MIT's economics department, where he became the Pentti J.K. Kouri Career Development Assistant Professor of Economics in 2002 before being promoted to associate professor in 2003 and receiving tenure in 2005. He was made full professor at MIT in 2008 where he taught undergraduate courses titled "Microeconomic Theory and Public Policy" and "Putting Social Science to the Test: Experiments in Economics". In parallel to his position at MIT, Autor is or has been affiliated with several research institutions, including the National Bureau of Economic Research, the Poverty Action Lab, Institute for the Study of Labor (IZA) and IZA World of Labor, is or has been the editor of economic academic journals such as the Journal of Economic Perspectives (2009–14), Journal of Labor Economics (2007–08), Journal of Economic Literature (2004–06) and the Review of Economics and Statistics (2002–2008). Finally, he is a co-director of the MIT School Effectiveness and Inequality Initiative (SEII), a research program focusing on the economics of education and the relationship between human capital and the American income distribution. He is a research associate at the NBER where he directs the Labor Studies Program, as well as an associate director of the NBER Disability Research Center.

== Research ==
David Autor's research primarily focuses on five areas: (1) Inequality, technological change, and globalization; (2) disability and labor force participation; (3) labor market intermediation; (4) neighborhoods, housing market spillovers, and price controls; and (5) labor market impacts of wrongful discharge protections. The economics bibliographic database IDEAS/RePEc ranks him among the top 5% of economists under a number of criteria, including average rank score, number of works, and number of citations.

One of his most cited articles, co-authored with Alan B. Krueger and Lawrence F. Katz, studies the effect of skill-biased technological change in the form of computerization on the diverging U.S. education wage differentials and finds evidence suggesting that computerization has increased skill-based wage premia in the U.S. by requiring rapid skill upgrading, which in turn has increased the labor demand for college graduates relative to workers without tertiary education as well as the wage premium associated with a college degree.

In 2009 Autor contributed to the book Studies of Labor Market Intermediation as an editor during his time at the University of Chicago. He would later go on to write "The Work of the Future: Building Better Jobs in Age of Smart Machines" with his colleagues at MIT. In an influential 2013 study co-authored with David Dorn and Gordon H. Hanson, Autor showed that U.S. exposure to Chinese trade competition "caused higher unemployment, lower labor force participation, and reduced wages in local labor markets that house import-competing manufacturing industries". The study nonetheless finds that trade is a net gain for the population as a whole, and Autor has been an advocate for the Trans-Pacific Partnership as a means to protect U.S. workers. In 2020, Dr. Autor received the 25th Anniversary Special Recognition Heinz Award for his work and also received attention for his work with Elisabeth Reynolds on the adverse impacts of coronavirus disease 2019 on the office economy.

Autor has also examined the implications of artificial intelligence for employment, wages, and the value of human expertise. He distinguishes between technologies that automate workers' specialized tasks and those that automate supporting tasks, arguing that the effects on wages employment depend partly on which tasks are replaced. In an interview with the Federal Reserve Bank of St. Louis's Teach Economics podcast, Autor emphasized that although automation can increase productivity, its benefits are not necessarily distributed equally across workers. He also suggested that AI may have different labor market effects from earlier waves of computerization.

== Selected Publications ==
- Autor, D., Katz, L.F., Krueger, A.B. (1998). Computing Inequality: Have Computers Changed the Labor Market? Quarterly Journal of Economics, 113(4), pp. 1169-1213.
- Autor, David H; Dorn, David; Hanson, Gordon H (2013-10-01). "The China Syndrome: Local Labor Market Effects of Import Competition in the United States" (PDF). American Economic Review. 103 (6): 2121–2168. doi:10.1257/aer.103.6.2121. hdl:1721.1/95952. ISSN 0002-8282. S2CID 2498232.

== Sources ==
- Curriculum Vitae of David Autor
