= 61st Munich Security Conference =

2025 diplomatic meeting in Germany

61st Munich Security Conference Münchner Sicherheitskonferenz
- Nickname: MSC 2025
- Begins: 14 February 2025
- Ends: 16 February 2025
- Venue: Hotel Bayerischer Hof
- Locations: Munich, Germany
- Previous event: 60th (2024)
- Next event: 62nd (2026)

The 61st Munich Security Conference (MSC 2025) was the annual meeting of the Munich Security Conference, that took place from 14 February to 16 February 2025 in Munich, Germany. A few days earlier the Munich Security Report had been published. Its title served as thematic framework for the conference: 'multipolarization' - A state of global reorganization between promising opportunities and endangered communality, especially in the management of crises and threats. According to the report, “depolarization” and substantial reforms of the international order are now needed more than ever. During the conference, a series of US statements at the conference sparked controversy and unrest among the attending European politicians. Key outcomes of the conference include further weakening of the transatlantic alliance, US attitude shift about the war in Ukraine – and Europe in general, increased US pressure on Europe to further raise defence spending, calls by the US for Europe to further increase military aid to Ukraine, and discord between US and Europe on topics as diverse as election interference, trade, freedom of speech and democratic values.

== Background ==
It was almost three years since the Russian invasion of Ukraine. Donald Trump had started his second presidency 25 days before the conference.

One day before the event, a car attack in Munich injured 36 people. The conference ran just over one week before the 2025 German federal election.

== Attendees ==
Attendees of the conference included:

- (European Union) Ursula von der Leyen, President of the European Commission
- (European Union) Roberta Metsola, President of the European Parliament
- (European Union) Kaja Kallas, Vice-President of the European Commission
- (NATO) Mark Rutte, Secretary General
- (United States) JD Vance, Vice President
- (United States) Marco Rubio, Secretary of State
- (United States) Lindsey Graham, Senator
- (United States) Jeanne Shaheen, Senator
- (United States) Sheldon Whitehouse, Senator
- (United States) John Cornyn, Senator
- (Ukraine) Volodymyr Zelenskyy, President
- (Georgia (country)) Salome Zourabichvili, 5th President
- Sviatlana Tsikhanouskaya, Head of the United Transitional Cabinet of Belarus
- (Germany) Olaf Scholz, Chancellor
- (Germany) Frank-Walter Steinmeier, President
- (Germany) Annalena Baerbock, Federal Minister for Foreign Affairs
- (Germany) Jörg Kukies, Federal Minister for Finance
- (Poland) Radosław Sikorski, Minister of Foreign Affairs
- (France) Jean-Noël Barrot, Minister for Europe and Foreign Affairs
- (China) Wang Yi, Chinese Communist Party Politburo foreign chief and Foreign Minister
- (South Korea) Cho Tae-yul, Minister of Foreign Affairs
- (Japan) Takeshi Iwaya, Minister of Foreign Affairs
- (United Kingdom) John Healey, Defence Secretary
- (United Kingdom) David Lammy, Foreign Secretary
- (Latvia) Edgars Rinkēvičs, President
- (Latvia) Evika Siliņa, Prime Minister
- (Ghana) John Mahama, President
- (Democratic Republic of the Congo) Félix Tshisekedi, President
- (India) S. Jaishankar, Minister of External Affairs
- (Canada) Mélanie Joly, Foreign Minister
- (Pakistan) Bilawal Bhutto Zardari, Former Foreign Minister
- (Ivory Coast) Téné Birahima Ouattara, Minister of Defense
- (Israel) Gideon Sa‘ar, Minister for Foreign Affairs
- (Singapore) Ng Eng Hen, Minister for Defense
- (Lithuania) Gitanas Nausėda, President
- (Denmark) Mette Frederiksen, Prime Minister
- (Estonia) Alar Karis, President
- (Norway) Jonas Gahr Støre, Prime Minister
- (Norway) Jens Stoltenberg, Minister of Finance
- (Czech Republic) Petr Pavel, President
- (Sweden) Maria Malmer Stenergard, Minister for Foreign Affairs
- (Finland) Alexander Stubb, President
- (Finland) Elina Valtonen, Minister for Foreign Affairs
- (Croatia) Andrej Plenković, Prime Minister
- (Iceland) Kristrún Frostadóttir, Prime Minister
- (Albania) Edi Rama, Prime Minister
- (North Macedonia) Hristijan Mickoski, Prime Minister
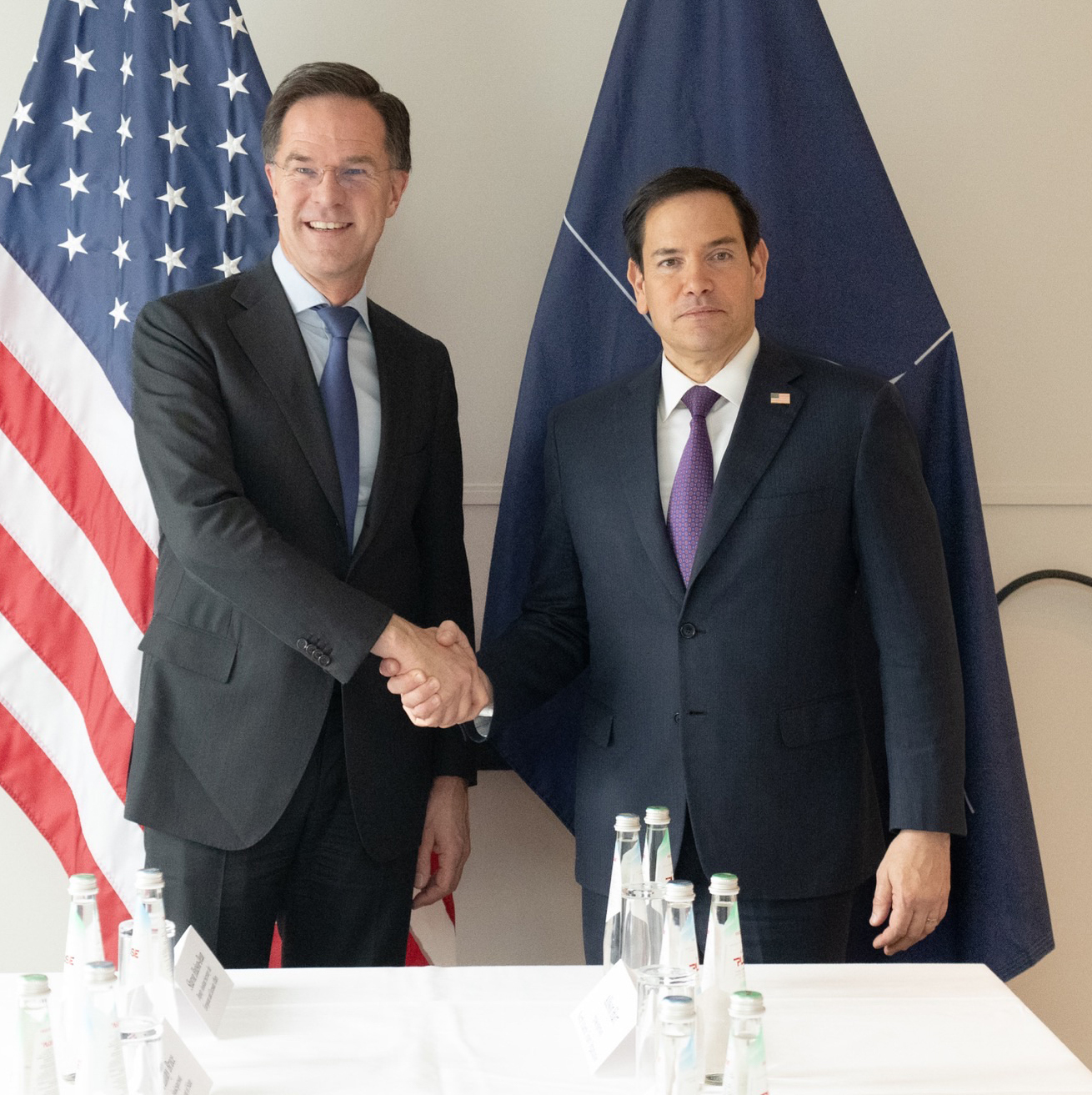
Secretary Marco Rubio meets with NATO Secretary General Mark Rutte

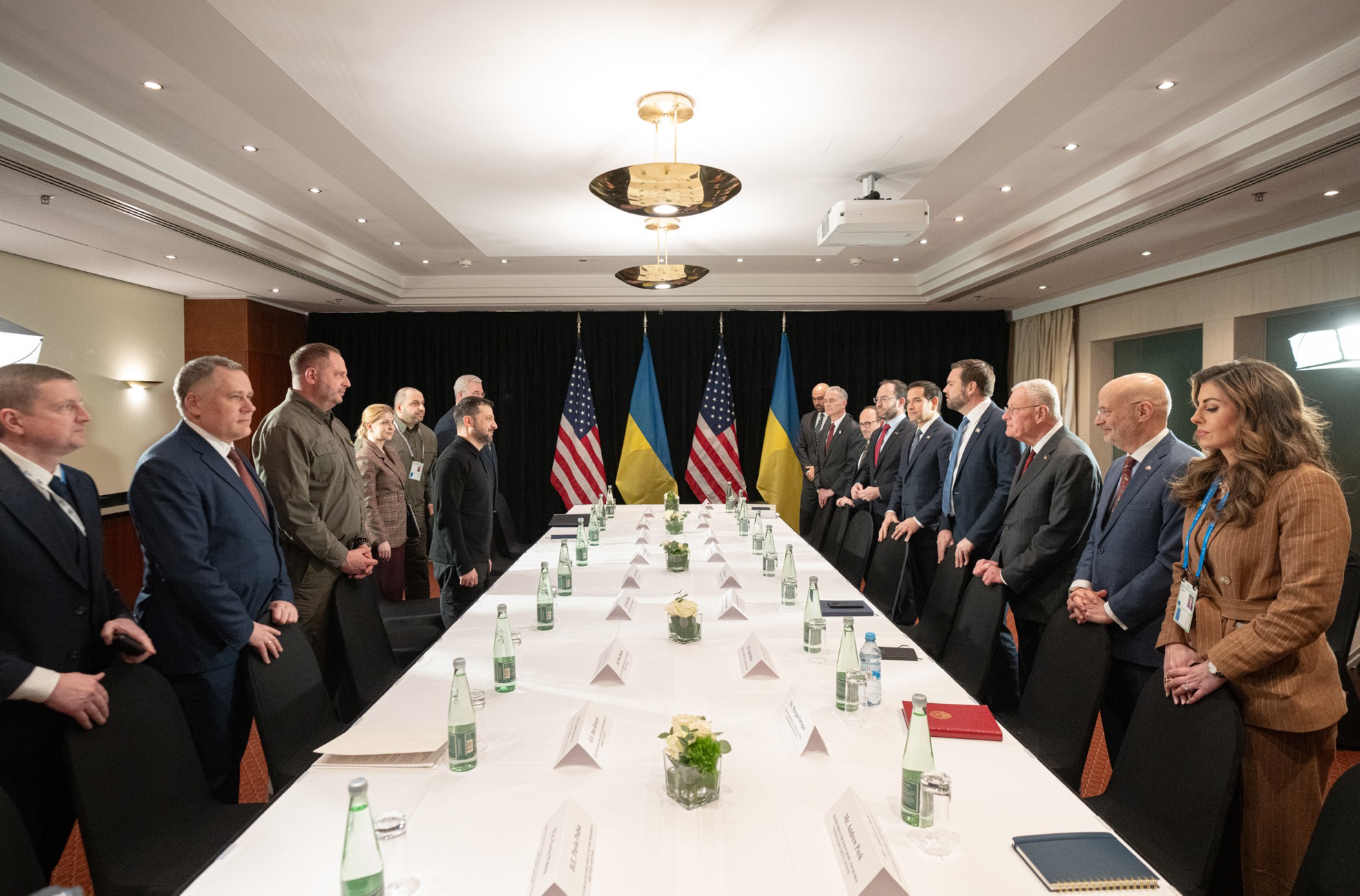
Ukraine and US delegations meet

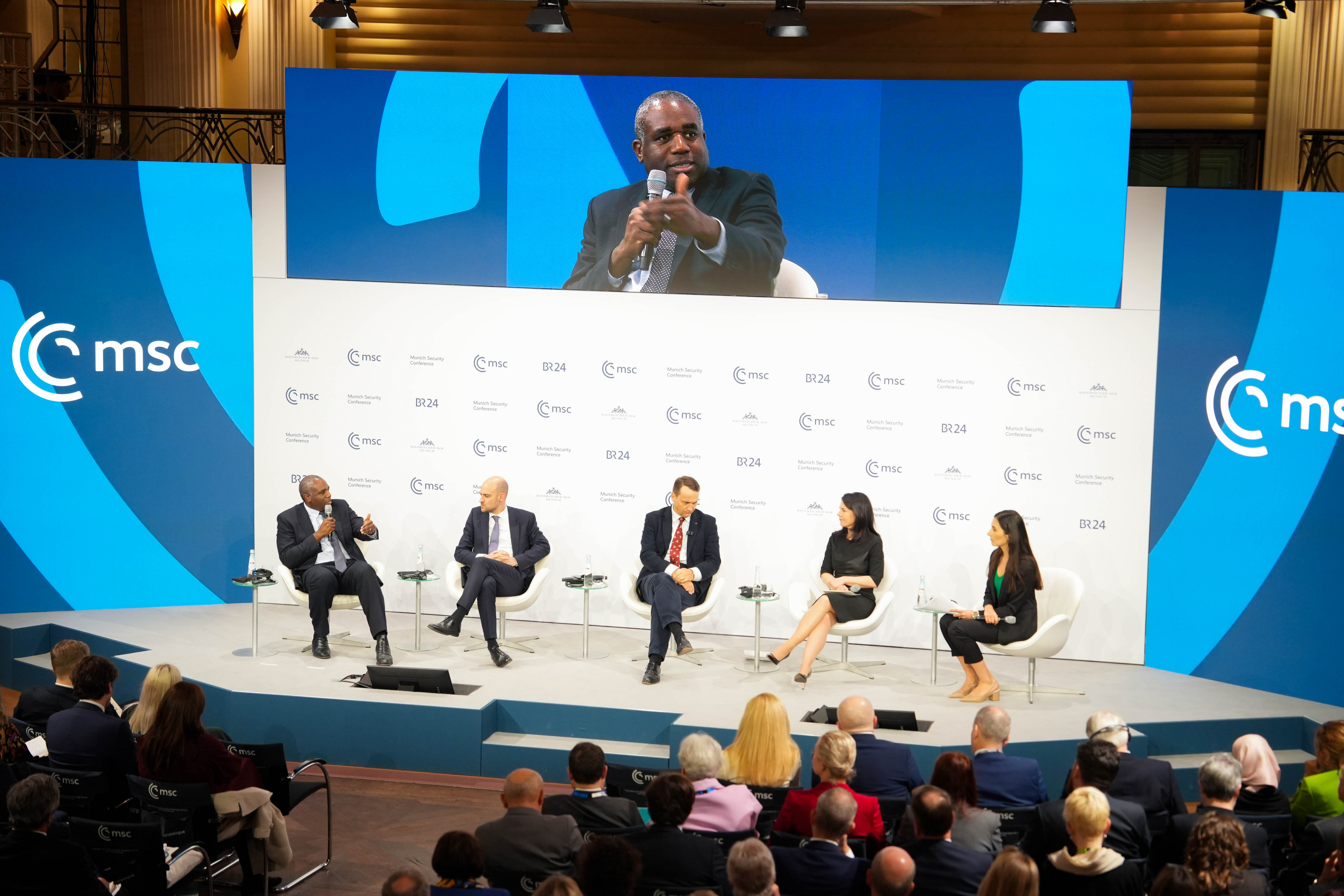
Panel discussion on Euro-Atlantic security at the Munich Security Conference

== Conference ==
The conference was opened on 14 February 2025 by German president Frank-Walter Steinmeier. During the event, Ukrainian president Volodymyr Zelenskyy met with US vice president JD Vance, while Vance also met with Alice Weidel, co-chairwoman of the far-right Alternative for Germany (AfD), and with opposition leader Friedrich Merz. Zelenskyy also had a meeting with several United States senators from both major US political parties.

Mark Rutte, the secretary general of NATO, said that European countries needed to come up with plans for Ukraine if they wished to play a major role in discussions on a peace settlement for the Russia–Ukraine war.

In a speech, Vance said that illegal migration was the "most urgent" challenge faced by Europe. Vance also said that European leaders need to do more to contribute to Ukrainian defense as the US focuses more on China. Vance also claimed that European states were failing to uphold free speech and democratic values, criticizing the firewall against the far-right in Germany and the decision to cancel the results of the 2024 Romanian presidential election because of Russian interference in the campaign.

Vance's speech was criticised, among others, by Chancellor Olaf Scholz (Social Democratic Party of Germany), Natalia Pouzyreff (The Republic on the Move), Opposition Leader and next Chancellor Friedrich Merz (Christian Democratic Union of Germany), Vice Chancellor Robert Habeck (Alliance 90/The Greens), and Minister for Foreign Annalena Baerbock (Alliance 90/The Greens). Marie-Agnes Strack-Zimmermann (Free Democratic Party) called Vance's speech a "bizarre intellectual bottom".

Although reactions varied, Scholz said,

that is why we will not accept outsiders interfering in our democracy, our elections, and in the democratic formation of opinions in support and for the benefit of this party … that is not appropriate – especially among friends and allies, and we firmly reject this.

— Chancellor Olaf Scholz

Scholz also said "the democratic parties in Germany 'have a common consensus' because of the experiences with national socialism: that consensus is the firewall against extreme right parties", (Note: Seeking to defend the constitution and laws of the Federal Republic of Germany against all enemies, foreign and domestic, is similar to what is found in the Oath of Allegiance.) stressing further that "the Federal Republic [of Germany] is a democracy, that created itself from the opposition against national socialism and against fascism", national socialism and their monstrous crimes have been trivialised from the ranks of the AfD as a speck of "birdshit in German history", "a commitment to 'never again', as Vance made during a visit to the Dachau concentration camp memorial site, cannot be reconciled with support for the AfD", and that Germans "decide their democracy for themselves."

German Minister of Defense Boris Pistorius said,

if I have understood him correctly, he is comparing conditions in parts of Europe with those in authoritarian regions ... that is not acceptable.

Merz said,

The Americans are calling into question democratic institutions. They are openly interfering in an election. It is not the job of the US government to tell us how to protect democratic institutions in Germany.

Habeck noted that in the US "a new form of technological money-nobility" is currently emerging as a social class that needs German and European responses, and "what Vance did yesterday [...] it must be said as clearly as this [...] it's none of your business [...] deal with your own stuff, there are enough challenges in the US." Merz criticised Vance's interference in the German election, rejected Vance's allegation of a value deficit in Europe saying that lawful regulation of hate speech and fake news by independent courts is absolutely appropriate, and pointed out that journalists would never be denied access to the chancellory in reference to Associated Press staff being denied access to the White House and Air Force One for their choice of speech around the name of the Gulf of Mexico.

Zelenskyy called for the creation of a European army. Such an army is a prerequisite to Europe, which has more than twice the population of the US, developing its own nuclear umbrella. Currently that umbrella is contributed to NATO by the US as a deterrent, with Belgium, Germany, Italy, the Netherlands and Turkey being nuclear sharing participants and France and the UK maintaining their own nuclear weapons. Loss of this umbrella would create a significant gap, and might lead to what it was in part created to prevent: proliferation of nuclear weapons and emergence of Europe as anything but an indivisible albeit junior partner of the US.

== See also ==
- Peace negotiations in the Russian invasion of Ukraine
- London and Paris Conferences
- Two Plus Four Agreement
- Budapest Memorandum
- Minsk agreements
- 62nd Munich Security Conference
