= Douglas Gale =

American economist (born 1950)

Douglas Gale FBA is an economics professor at New York University. At NYU, Gale is a Julius Silver professor. He was elected a fellow of the British Academy in 2016. Gale is a specialist in general equilibrium theory, financial economics and banking, experimental economics and decision theory.

== Education ==
Douglas Gale attended Trent University from 1967-1970 and obtained a Bachelor of Science in Economics after graduating. From 1970-1972 Gale attended Carleton University and received a Master of Arts in Economics. Gale then received his Ph.D in Economics in 1975 from Christ's College, University of Cambridge. Afterwards, Gale conducted a junior research fellowship at Churchill College, University of Cambridge from 1975-1978.

== Professional career ==
During his career, Douglas Gale has worked at several universities and academic institutions such as Churchill College, Cambridge, London School of Economics, University of Pennsylvania, University of Pittsburgh, Massachusetts Institute of Technology, Boston University, and New York University.

== Selected publications ==
- Capital market imperfections in stock market economies. London School of Economics and Political Science, 1981.
- Money: In equilibrium. Nisbet, Welwyn, 1982.
- Money: In disequilibrium. Nisbet, Welwyn, 1983.
- Financial Innovation and Risk Sharing. MIT Press, Cambridge, MA:, 1994. (with Franklin Allen)
- Comparing Financial Systems. MIT Press, Cambridge, MA:, 2000. (with Franklin Allen)
- Strategic Foundations of General Equilibrium: Dynamic Matching and Bargaining Games. Cambridge University Press, Cambridge, 2000.
