= Gordon Hanson =

American economist (born 1964)

- Born: Gordon Howard Hanson; August 5, 1964 (age 62)

Academic background
- Education: Massachusetts Institute of Technology (Ph.D., 1992)
- Thesis: Industry agglomeration and trade in Mexico (1992)
- Doctoral advisor: Michael J. Piore & Paul Krugman
- Awards: Fellow of the Institute for the Study of Labor
- Website: Information at IDEAS / RePEc

Gordon Howard Hanson (born August 5, 1964) is the Peter Wertheim Professor in Urban Policy at the Harvard Kennedy School.

== Education ==
Hanson received his A.B. from Occidental College in 1986 and his Ph.D. from Massachusetts Institute of Technology in 1992, both in economics. His Ph.D. dissertation was entitled Industry agglomeration and trade in Mexico, and his doctoral advisor was Michael J. Piore and was co-advised by Paul Krugman.

== Career ==
Hanson served on the faculty of the University of Michigan from 1998 to 2001. In 2001, he joined UCSD as a professor at the School of International Relations and Pacific Studies, a position he held until 2012. Since 2015, he has been the Pacific Economic Cooperation Chair in International Economic Relations at UCSD's School of Global Policy and Strategy. He previously served as the acting dean of the UC San Diego School of Global Policy and Strategy. He joined the Harvard Kennedy School in 2020.

== Research ==
Hanson's research focuses on, among other topics, the causes and effects of immigration to the United States. For instance, his research has concluded that high-skilled immigrants benefit the U.S.'s economy through innovation, and that low-skilled immigrants do so through other means, including the fact that they are more willing to move to find work than native-born workers in the U.S. He has also studied the effects of NAFTA on industries and workers since the agreement was signed in the 1990s. In two papers, one released in 2013 and the other in 2016, Hanson, along with David Autor and David Dorn, concluded that trade between the U.S. and China was having adverse effects on parts of the American labor market. Their 2016 study also found that these adverse effects existed in all developed countries, not just the U.S., and that they were larger than many economists thought possible.

== Honors, awards and editorial activities ==
Hanson is a research associate at the National Bureau of Economic Research, and has been a fellow of the Institute for the Study of Labor since 2005. Since 2015, he has been a co-editor of the Journal of Economic Perspectives.
