= François Godement =

French historian

- Born: June 14, 1949 (age 77)

Academic work
- School or tradition: Professor at Sciences Po
- Main interests: Specialist in China and International relations of East Asia; Director of Strategy of Asia Centre, Paris.

François Godement (born June 14, 1949) is a French historian, specialist of China and international relations in East Asia. He is now a Professor in political science at Sciences Po and the Director for the strategy of Asia Centre, Paris.

== Biography ==
Professor of political science since 1992, François Godement has received teaching appointments at the University of California, at the National Institute of Oriental Languages and Civilizations (INALCO) until 2006, at the French Institute of International Relations (IFRI) from 1985 to 2005, and at Sciences Po, Paris.

François Godement is a graduate of the Ecole Normale Supérieure de la rue d'Ulm (Paris), he was a Harvard University postgraduate student, and he holds a Ph.D. in contemporary history. His research focuses on China’s foreign affairs, domestic factors of China’s strategic and international conceptions, compared politics in East Asia, integration process in Asia, security and international relations’ architecture in Asia.

He helped found the European Committee of the Council for Security Cooperation in the Asia-Pacific (CSCAP), which disappeared and was then replaced by the EU Committee, and is a co-founder of the Council for Asia-Europe Cooperation (CAEC). He has been a consultant to the Organisation for Economic Co-operation and Development (OECD), the European Union and the World Bank, and is an outside consultant to the Policy Planning staff of the French Ministry of Foreign Affairs. He is a Senior policy fellow of the European Council on Foreign Relations (ECFR). He founded Asia Centre in Paris in 2005, was its president until 2009 and then became its Strategy Director.

== Asia Centre ==
Asia Centre, established in August 2005 by Godement and a team of research fellows and experts on contemporary Asia, is an independent research institute which conducts discussions and produces publications on the strategic and economic aspects of international relations as well as current political and social transformations in the Asia-Pacific region.

== Publications ==
- Renaissance de l'Asie, Odile Jacob, 1993
- Communismes d'Asie, mort ou métamorphose ?, with Jean-Luc Domenach, Complexe, 1994
- The New Asian Renaissance: From Colonialism to the Post Cold-War, 1997
- Dragon de feu, dragon de papier, l'Asie a-t-elle un avenir ?, Flammarion, 1998
- The Downsizing of Asia, 1999
- Chine - États-Unis : méfiance et pragmatisme, La Documentation française, 2001
- Que veut la Chine ? De Mao au capitalisme, 2012
- Contemporary China: Between Mao and Market, 2016
