= Incentive theory =

Incentive theory may refer to:

- Organizational behavior#Organization structures and dynamics, a concept of human resources or management theory
- Motivation#Incentive theory, a motivational theory
