= CEMFI =

Madrid institution for economics study

Center for Monetary and Financial Studies
- Centro de Estudios Monetarios y Financieros
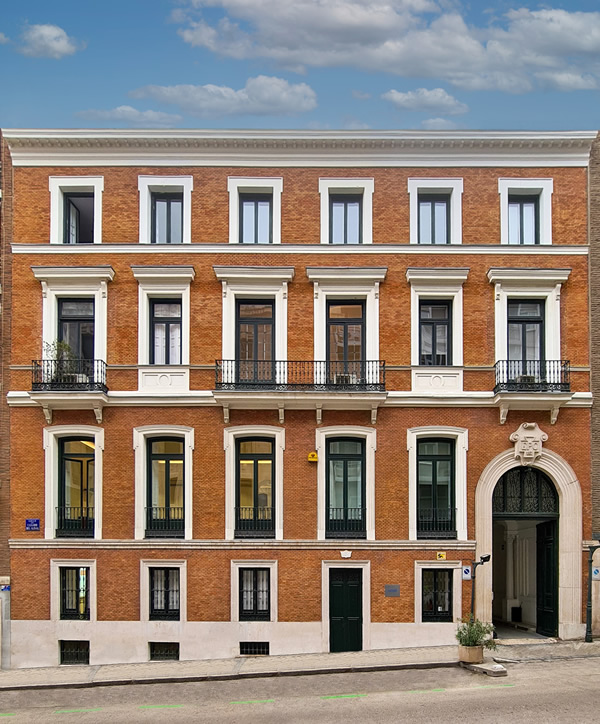
- Other names: CEMFI
- Established: 1987 by the Bank of Spain; Independent institution since 1991
- Affiliations: Bank of Spain; Menéndez Pelayo International University (UIMP)
- Director: Nezih Guner
- Location: Casado del Alisal, 5, Madrid, Spain
- Website: www.cemfi.es
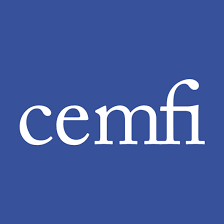

CEMFI (Spanish: Centro de Estudios Monetarios y Financieros; English: Center for Monetary and Financial Studies) is a leading postgraduate institution devoted to teaching and research in Economics. It was started in 1987, becoming the foundation of the Bank of Spain in 1991. It is located in Madrid.

It runs two graduate programs, a Master in Economics and Finance and a PhD in Economics, with the aim of training high-level specialists for academia and professional careers. Both are taught in English. The official degrees are granted by Menéndez Pelayo International University.

CEMFI also offers a Summer School for practitioners, professors, and researchers, and an Undergraduate Summer Internships program.

Research activity at CEMFI is centered around five research lines: Macroeconomics, Microeconomics, Applied Economics, Banking and Finance, and Econometrics. Several faculty members have been elected Fellows of the Econometric Society, Fellows of the European Economic Association, and Research Fellows of the Centre for Economic Policy Research, among other institutions. Additionally, CEMFI has cooperated with the Spanish Ministry of Inclusion, Social Security and Migration and J-PAL Europe in the Inclusion Policy Lab. It helped design and evaluate 23 pilot randomized controlled trials promoting social inclusion within the framework of the Spanish minimum income scheme.

== Notable faculty ==
- Rafael Repullo, PhD London School of Economics
- Manuel Arellano, PhD London School of Economics
- Monica Martinez-Bravo, PhD MIT
- Enrique Sentana, PhD London School of Economics
- Javier Suarez, PhD London School of Economics
