= Foreign policy of the second Trump administration =

The foreign policy of the second Trump administration has been described as imperialist, expansionist, and interventionist in respect to the Americas and Middle East, but also isolationist in respect to Europe and Africa. Trump has used the expansive version of the Monroe Doctrine, that Donald Trump himself called the "Donroe Doctrine". His foreign policy has been compared to the policy of former president William McKinley. Trump's deputy chief of staff, Stephen Miller, explained their policy saying: "We're a superpower. And under President Trump, we are going to conduct ourselves as a superpower."

The foreign policy of the Trump administration has been described as breaking the post-1945 rules-based liberal international order and as an abandonment of multilateralism. It involved dismantling or withdrawing support for both domestic and international institutions working to strengthen the American soft power, and favoring instead hard power. The moves were described as undermining American global leadership and creating a power vacuum for Russia and China. Trump's relations with U.S. allies have been transactional and spanned from indifference to animosity, while he has sought friendly relationships with some U.S. adversaries. The actions saw large drops in global public opinion of the US.

Trump initiated trade wars with Canada and Mexico, and continued the ongoing trade war with China. He has repeatedly expressed his wish to annex Canada, Greenland, and the Panama Canal. He has taken a pro-Israel stance and increased support for Israel in the Gaza war. In response to the Gaza war, he proposed taking over the Gaza Strip, forcibly relocating its people to other Arab countries such as Jordan and Egypt, and turning it into a special economic zone. However, in November 2026, Trump announced the cessation of $4 billion in annual U.S. military aid by year's end, though military hardware sales would continue. In Latin America, Trump authorized a series of strikes on alleged drug traffickers, the legality of which is widely disputed under both U.S. and international law, and subsequently ordered a military operation to capture Nicolás Maduro, the disputed president of Venezuela. Following the raid, Venezuela has been described as a de facto puppet state of the U.S. In 2026, he launched a major war on Iran with Israel with the stated goal of regime change which lead to the assassination of Supreme Leader Ali Khamenei. Trump has also been ambiguous in his approach to Russia, varying between realigning with Russian president Vladimir Putin, a longtime US adversary, yet continuing to maintain the majority of sanctions on the former while authorizing arms sales to and intelligence sharing with Ukraine in the context of the Russo-Ukrainian war. To end the Russian invasion of Ukraine, Trump's administration offered concessions to Russia; it also said that Ukraine was partly responsible for the invasion. These moves have been criticized by most US allies and by many international institutions.

== Appointments ==
Trump's 2025 foreign policy team

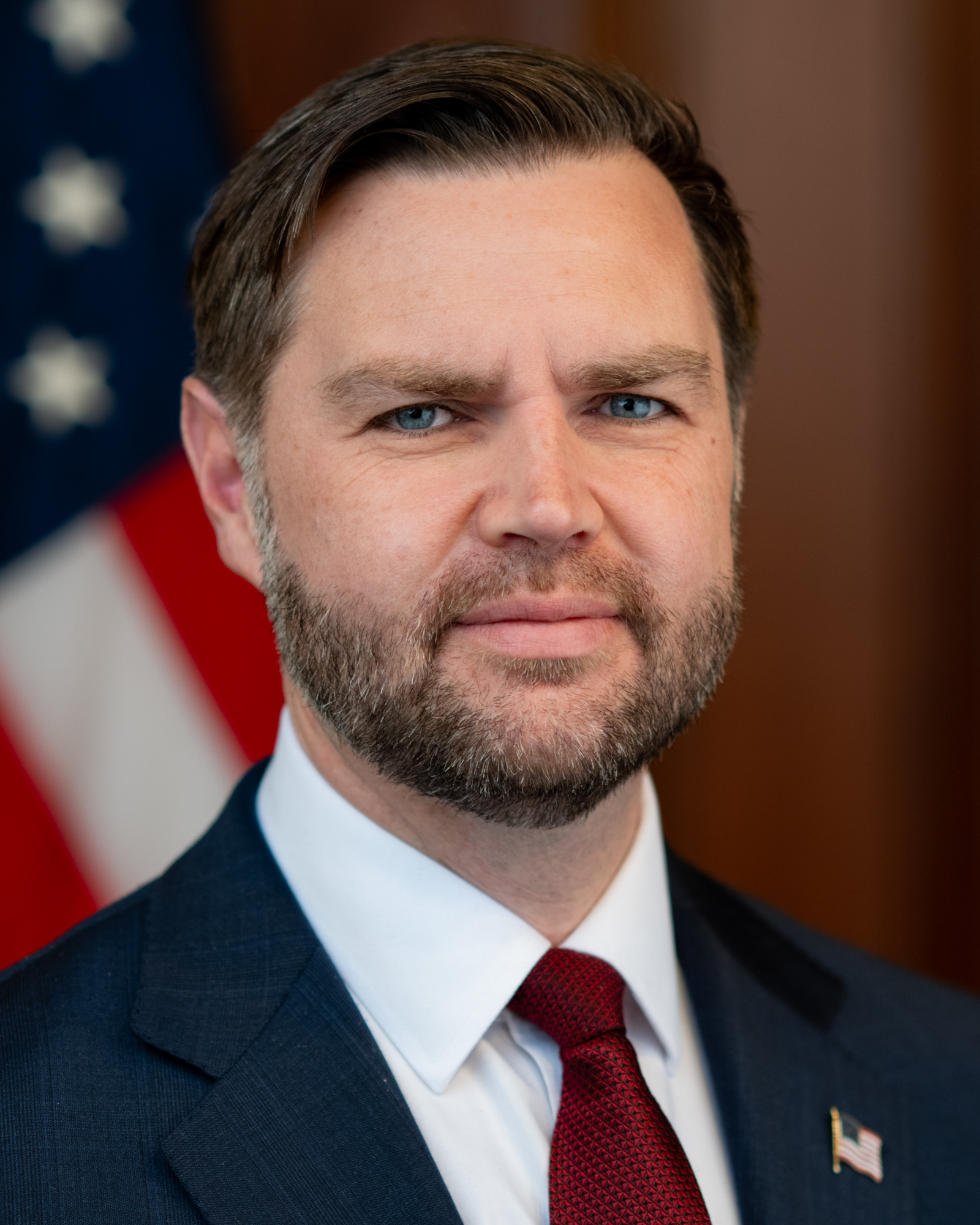
JD Vance

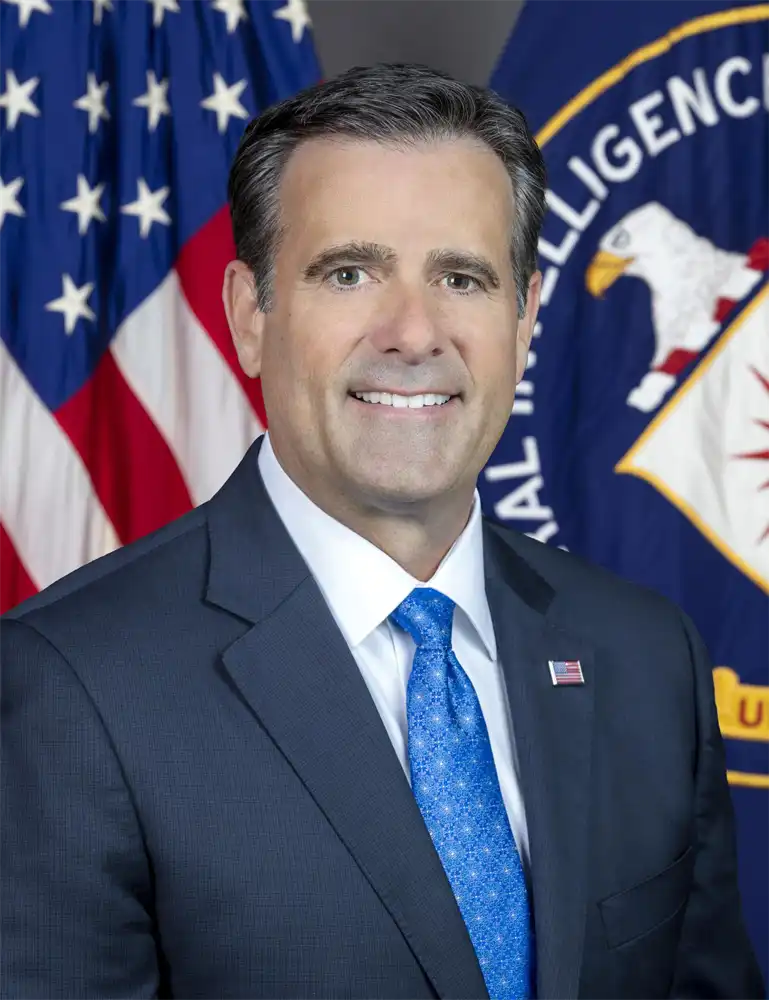
John Ratcliffe

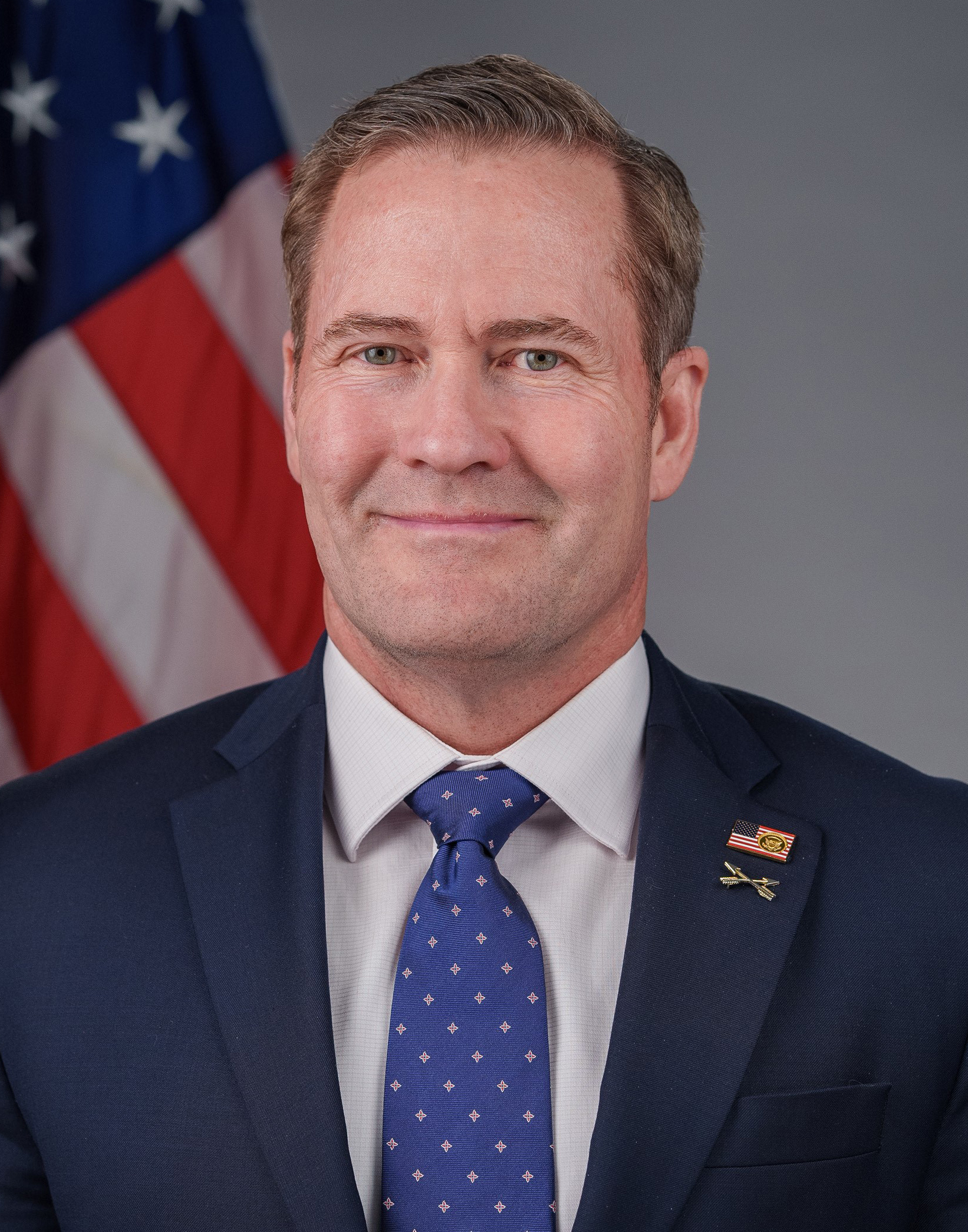
Mike Waltz

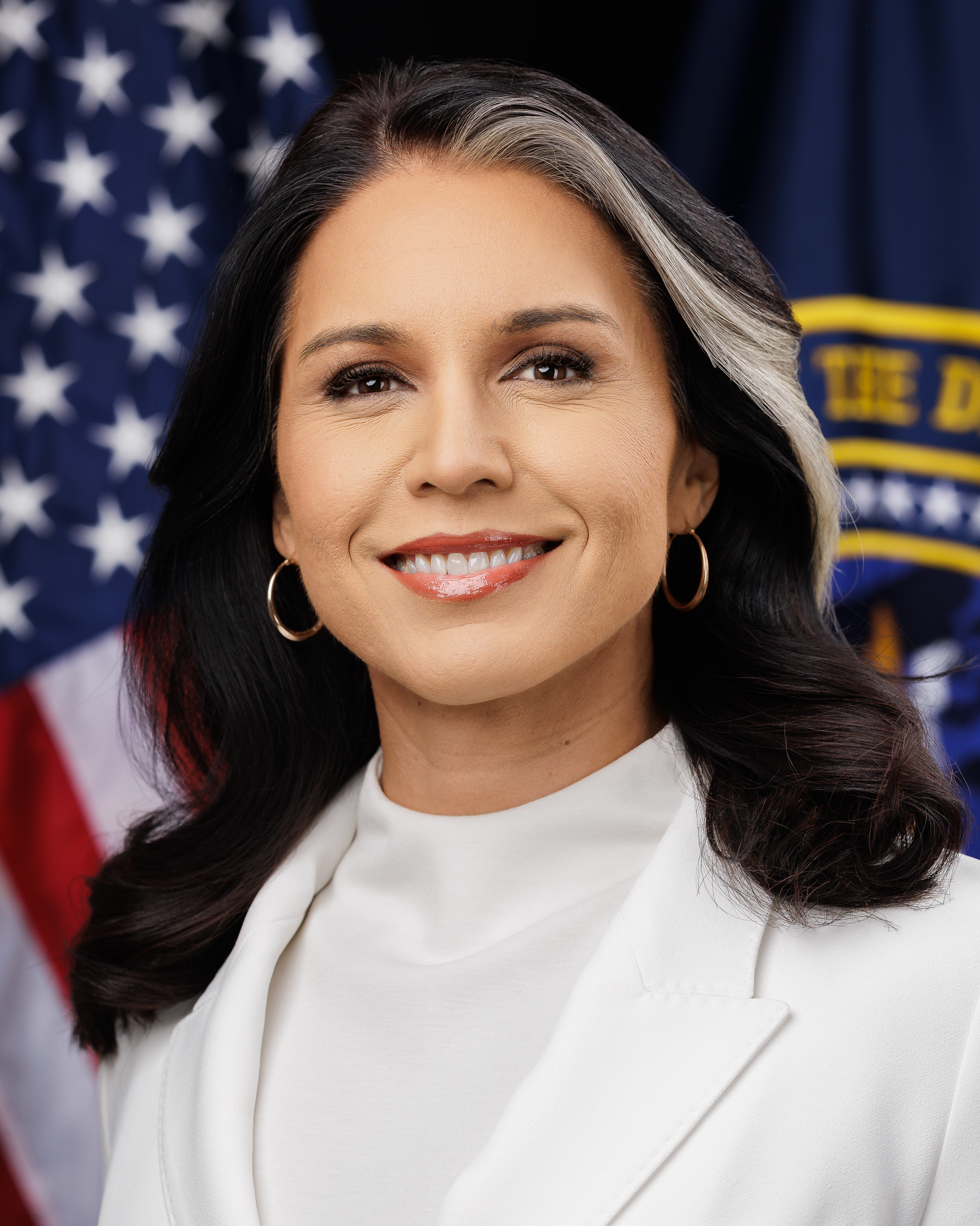
Tulsi Gabbard

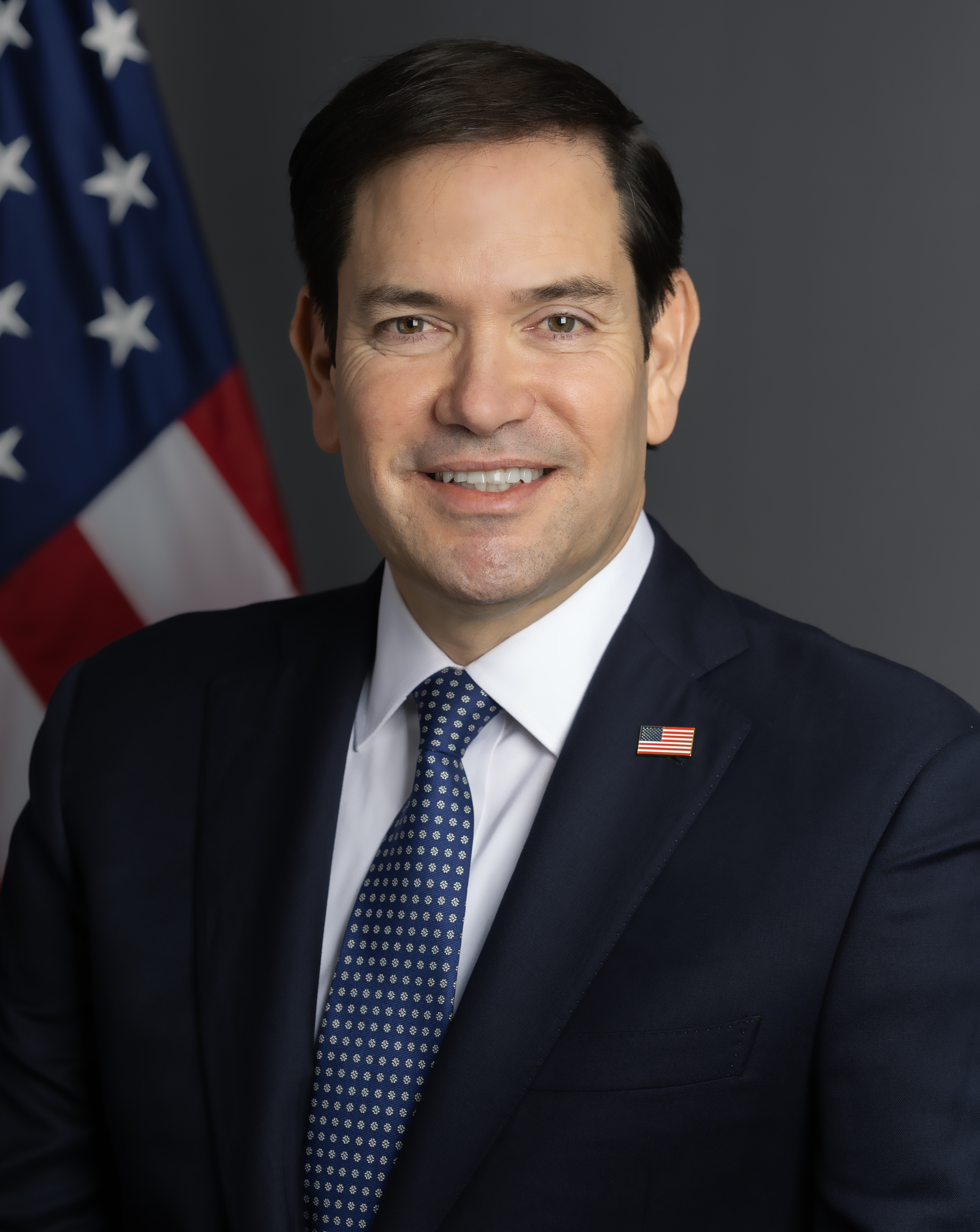
Marco Rubio

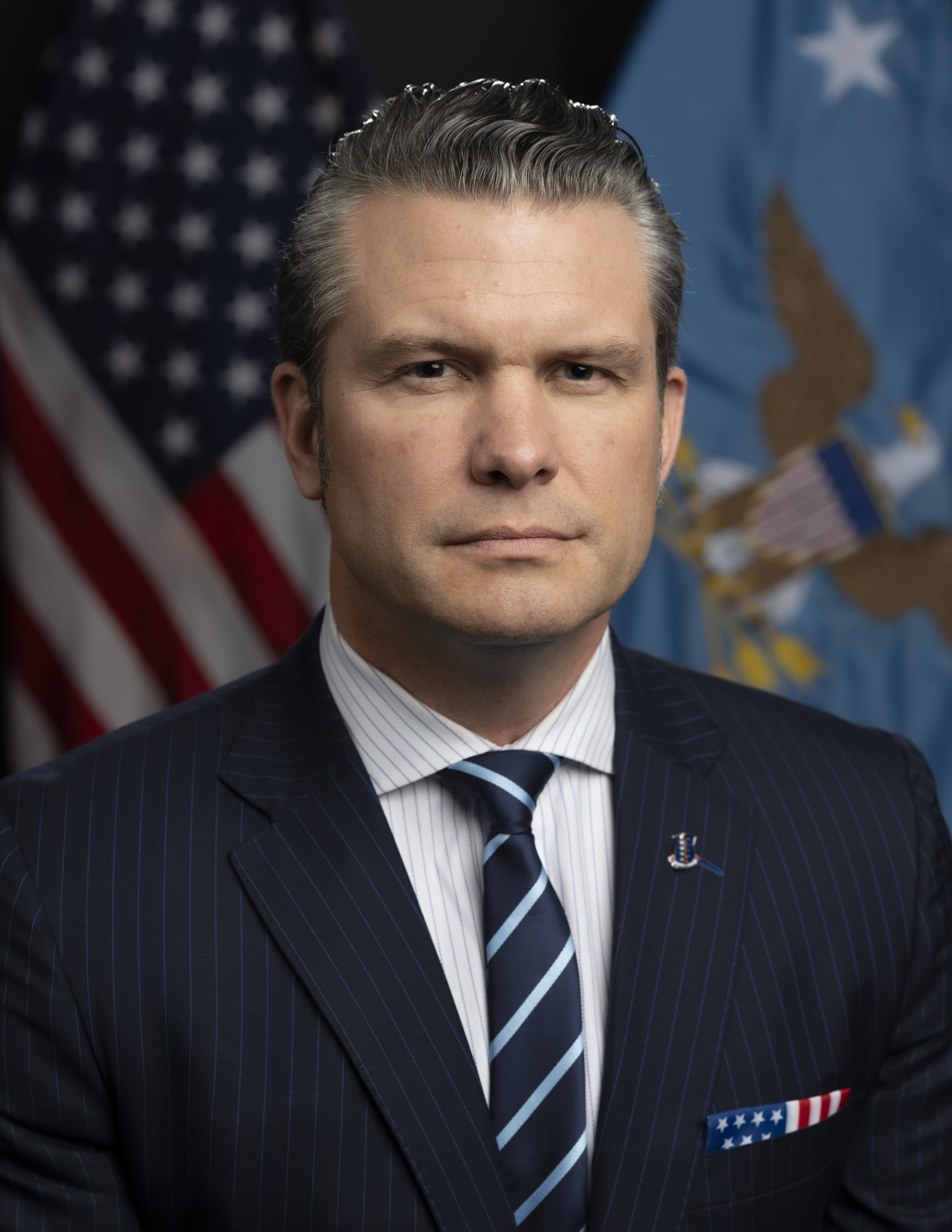
Pete Hegseth

Second Trump administration Foreign Policy Personnel
Vice President	JD Vance (2025–present)		
White House Chief of Staff	Susie Wiles (2025–present)		
Secretary of State	Lisa D. Kenna (Acting, 2025)	Marco Rubio (2025–present)	
Secretary of Defense	Robert G. Salesses (Acting, 2025)	Pete Hegseth (2025–present)	
Ambassador to the United Nations	Dorothy Shea (Acting, 2025)		Mike Waltz (2025–present)
Director of National Intelligence	Stacey Dixon (Acting, 2025)	Lora Shiao (2025)	Tulsi Gabbard (2025–2026)
Director of the Central Intelligence Agency	Maura Burns (Acting, 2025)	Tom Sylvester (Acting, 2025)	John Ratcliffe (2025–present)
Assistant to the President for National Security Affairs	Mike Waltz (2025)		Marco Rubio (2025–present)
Deputy National Security Advisor	Alex Wong (Acting, 2025)		Andy Baker/Robert Gabriel Jr. (2025–present)
Trade Representative	Juan Millán (Acting, 2025)		Jamieson Greer (2025–present)

== Analysis ==
A 2025 Pew Research Center study found that more than half in 19 of 24 countries surveyed, said they lack confidence in Trump's leadership of world affairs, with views about Trump differing sharply along ideological and partisan lines.

Among 24 surveyed countries, Trump's 2025 ratings trailed those of Joe Biden's 2024 ratings by an average of twelve percentage points in world affairs, though Trump fared better among right-wing populist parties in Europe.

Trump's U.S. foreign policy was described by The New York Times as ignoring protocol and shunning experts in favor of personal loyalty and "common sense and hard-nosed savvy". Trump's longtime friend and New York real estate developer, Steven Witkoff, was appointed as a special envoy. Witkoff stated his inexperience was an asset that gave him fresh eyes on world conflicts, and Trump's allies derided career diplomatic, military and intelligence officers who they claimed lacked the boldness and savvy of private-sector businessmen. The newspaper described Trump as interpreting flattery from world leaders as an indication of their willingness to compromise their national interests.

Trump favored harsh tactics with allies and adversaries to achieve his foreign policy goals, favoring hard power and dispensing with traditional American diplomatic tools. The administration expressed general opposition to international cooperation on areas such as the environment, global health, and economics, viewing such cooperation as against the national interest; it sought to reduce or end certain foreign aid, and to change relationships and policies accordingly. His administration dismantled or withdrew support from domestic and international organizations dedicated to advancing American soft power. Trump's decision to rename the United States Department of Defense to the "Department of War" was evidenced as indicative of the administration's stance on diplomacy and playing into foreign propaganda describing America as an aggressive power. Foreign policy experts described the moves to shutter USAID, Voice of America, and other organizations promoting American influence as diminishing America's global influence and creating a void that was filled by China and Russia. His administration saw large drops in global public opinion of the United States. Polling showed large swings of global public opinion preferring China as the world's leading power, with it viewed as a stabilizing presence rather than America. American tariff threats against treaty allies raised doubts about U.S. commitments to its partners, and were described as potentially pushing nations to align closer to China.

In September 2025, Pentagon leadership unveiled a draft of the National Defense Strategy which, in a change from prior strategy, prioritized domestic and regional missions rather than combating Russia and China. The moves shifted America's focus to the Western Hemisphere, and Trump's special envoy for Latin America Mauricio Claver-Carone explicitly said their overarching goal was to reassert American dominance over the Americas, with a particular focus on Latin America. Some foreign policy analysts, including international relations scholar Monica Toft believed the moves expressed a desire to divide the world into "spheres of influence" between America, Russia, and China, and top American officials, including US Defense Secretary Pete Hegseth later explained the strategy in those terms. The moves saw America issue a large-scale naval deployment in the Caribbean and military strikes against alleged drug boats. Experts speaking to Reuters and the BBC described the deployment as gunboat diplomacy. Trump declared multiple drug gangs as foreign terrorist organizations which was disputed as gangs are often motivated by money and not political ideology (which motivates Terrorism) with the designation seen as a way to gain support for the use of military force and for claims that the US was under invasion by immigrants. Trump signed 90 FR 46317 "to designate Antifa as a domestic terrorist organization". To build on the order and support NSPM-7 the administration designated Antifa Ost and three other groups "as Specially Designated Global Terrorists and intends to designate all four groups as Foreign Terrorist Organizations".

"We live in a world in which you can talk all you want about international niceties and everything else, but we live in a world, in the real world, Jake, that is governed by strength, that is governed by force, that is governed by power. These are the iron laws of the world since the beginning of time."

— Stephen Miller, during an interview with Jake Tapper explaining the Trump administration's views on foreign policy during the Greenland crisis (2026).

The final draft of the 2025 National Security Strategy described envisioning a narrower role for America than prior administrations, including during Trump's first term, largely abandoning mention of protecting democracy or freedom to instead focus on reducing migration and pursuing business deals such as encouraging countries to make no-bid contracts with American corporations. It also called to "reassert and enforce the Monroe Doctrine to restore American pre-eminence in the Western Hemisphere". Several pages depicted Europe as a victim of "civilizational erasure", said the US would cultivate "resistance" to Europe's mainstream leaders, and accused their governments of "tramp[ling] on basic principles of democracy to suppress opposition". The final draft called upon European nations to take "primary responsibility" for their own defense, accused the EU of stifling "political liberty", and warned that some NATO members risked becoming "majority non-European" and called upon the US to ally with "patriotic European parties", which was viewed as a euphemism for European far-right political parties. During an October 2026 speech in Athens, U.S. Secretary of State Marco Rubio framed American foreign policy as being in service of Western civilization to prevent a future of "atrophy and servitude and decline", saying that under Trump "we choose the unapologetic pursuit of national power".

Scott Anderson compared Trump's regime change ambitions to President Eisenhower. Trump's foreign policy has also been compared to the foreign policy of the George W. Bush administration. Edward Wong wrote that Trump's policy was "a resurrection of the mission of empire", "an embrace, and even a celebration, of Western imperial histories".

Writing for The Conversation, Donald Heflin noted that 79.5% of ambassadors appointed by the administration were political appointees rather than career diplomats, with many ambassadors being friends or donors to Trump.

== Africa ==
The Trump administration's Africa policy was characterized by a significant drawdown of U.S. military and diplomatic engagement with the continent. The administration proposed reorganizing U.S. military combatant commands in a manner that would effectively downgrade AFRICOM, folding Africa's oversight into a broader command structure alongside the Americas. The cuts to USAID and the proposed military restructuring were seen by analysts as creating strategic voids that rival powers, particularly Russia and China, could exploit.

=== Central Africa ===
==== Democratic Republic of the Congo and Rwanda ====
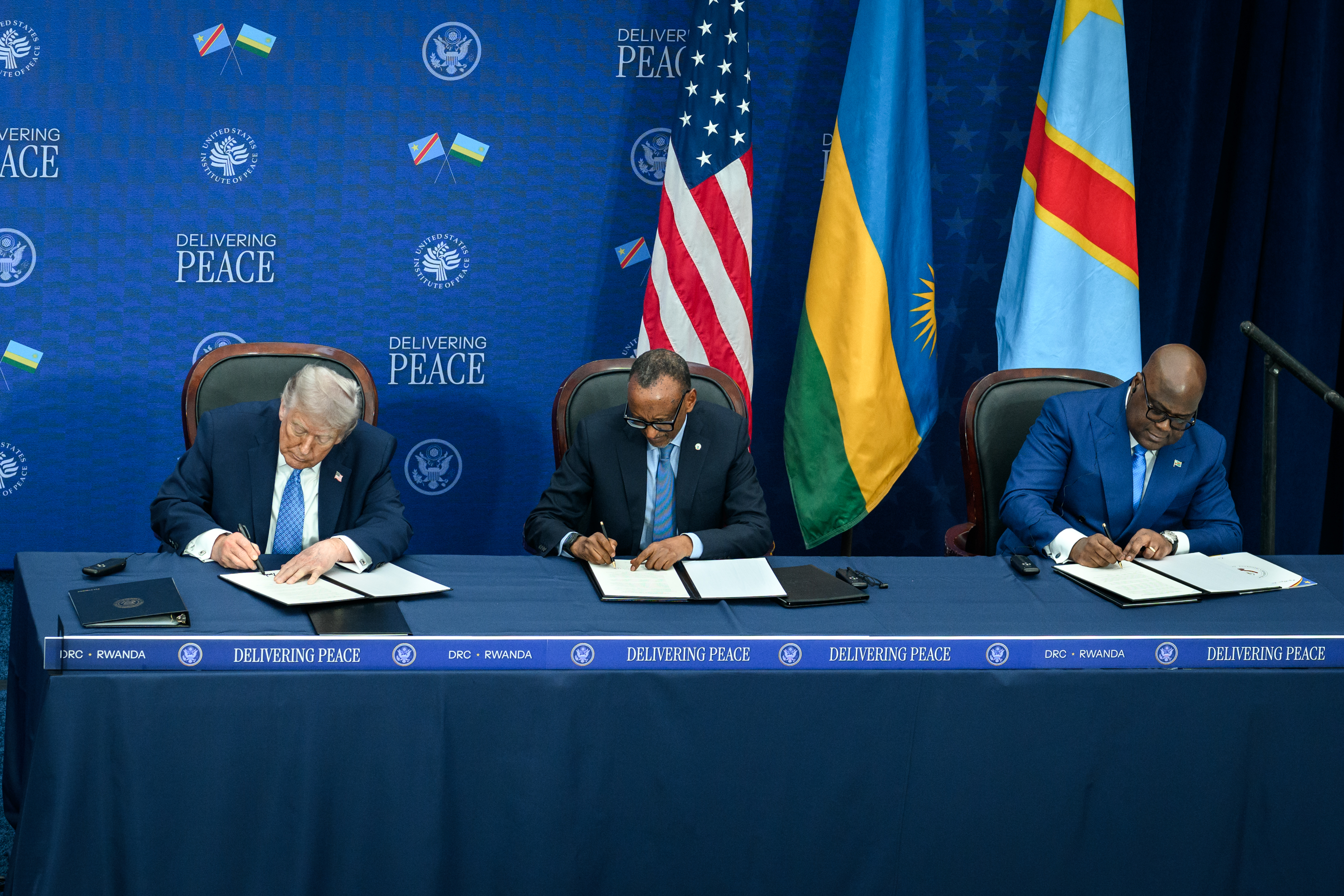
Trump signs the agreements, alongside Rwandan president Paul Kagame and Congolese president Félix Tshisekedi, December 4, 2025

Secretary of State Marco Rubio condemned the Rwandan–backed Goma offensive in the Democratic Republic of the Congo, affirming that the U.S. supports the Congolese sovereignty in a phone call with DRC President Félix Tshisekedi. Rubio called for an immediate ceasefire on January 28, 2025, after a phone conversation with Rwanda president Paul Kagame, and for all parties to respect sovereign territorial integrity.

In late June 2025, Rubio and the Qatari government helped broker a peace agreement between the DRC and Rwanda in an effort to end fighting in the eastern Democratic Republic of Congo. DRC President Tshisekedi and Rwandan president Kagame signed the peace agreement at the White House on June 27. As part of the agreement, Rwandan forces would withdraw within 90 days and the Rwandan and DRC governments would launch a regional economic integration framework within 90 days. The peace agreement also called for respecting territorial integrity and the disarmament of all non-state actors including the Rwandan-backed March 23 Movement and the Hutu-dominated Democratic Forces for the Liberation of Rwanda (FDLR). In addition, the peace agreement included provisions for US investment in the DRC's mineral sector. The Congo River Alliance and M23 did not participate in the White House peace agreement, preferring to wait the outcome of Qatari-brokered peace talks in Doha. On June 20, President Trump expressed support for the DRC-Rwandan peace talks, stating on Truth Social that: "This is a Great Day for Africa and, quite frankly, a Great Day for the World!..." By contrast, Congolese human rights activist and Nobel laureate Denis Mukwege and former DRC President Joseph Kabila criticised the peace agreement as disadvantageous to Congolese interests.

In early March 2026, the United States sanctioned the Rwandan Defence Force and four of its senior commanders on the grounds they had perpetuated the conflict in the DRC. In response, the Rwandan government denounced the sanctions as unfair and based on misinformation.

In April 2026, the Democratic Republic of Congo agreed to accept third-country deportees from the United States, with the first batch of 15 deportees arriving on 19 April.

=== North Africa ===
==== Sudan ====
In November 2025, Secretary of State Rubio called for international action to stop the flow of weapons to the Rapid Support Forces (RSF), the paramilitary group responsible for mass killings and atrocities in El Fasher and across Sudan's Darfur region. He emphasized that the U.S. knows which countries are involved in supplying the RSF and using their territories for transit, and that pressure is being applied at the highest levels to stop this aid. The United Arab Emirates (UAE) is widely accused by various sources, including the Sudanese army and U.N. investigators, of being the RSF's main foreign backer.

=== East Africa ===
==== Burundi ====
In late September 2026, Burundi agreed to accept third country deportees from the United States, who have not been accused of crimes or having terrorist links. The Burundi government also suggested it could provide a residency pathway to migrants wanting to remain in the country.

==== Rwanda ====
Trump meeting with Rwandan President Paul Kagame in the Oval Office, December 4, 2025

In April 2025, Rwanda accepted an Iraqi refugee who was deported from the United States. Neither party released details about this incident. Soon after, in May 2025, Rwanda started official negotiations with the United States to receive more deportees. This came shortly after the Trump administration started to crackdown on illegal immigration and to close down refugee programs. In August 2025, Rwanda agreed to receive up to 250 vetted deportees from the United States. On the same month, the United States government sent a group of 7 deportees to Rwanda. The Rwandan Ministry of Foreign Affairs and International Cooperation spokeswoman made an official announcement, explaining the deportees who chose to stay in the country would receive support and protection from the Rwandan government.

==== South Sudan ====
On April 5, 2025, Rubio and Deputy Secretary of State Christopher Landau announced that the United States would be revoking the visas of all South Sudanese citizens in the United States (including those with temporary protected status) and barring entry to all South Sudanese citizens following a bilateral dispute over the repatriation of a South Sudanese citizen. Rubio stated that the US government would consider reviewing these actions in return for securing South Sudanese cooperation in accepting repatriated nationals.

==== Uganda ====
On August 21, 2025, Ugandan Ministry of Foreign Affairs Secretary Bagiire Vincent Waiswa confirmed that Uganda had agreed to accept third-country deportees from the United States. Waiswa described this as a temporary agreement that included individuals with criminal records and no unaccompanied minors. He also said that Uganda preferred to accept deportees from African countries, who were unable to return to their home countries. Waiswa's announcement preceded earlier remarks by Ugandan Foreign Minister Henry Oryem Okello expressing reluctance in accepting illegal aliens from the United States due to concerns about crime and social cohesion. Oryem also stated that the Ugandan government was negotiating with the Trump Administration about visas, tariffs and sanctions.

=== Southern Africa ===
==== Eswatini ====
In mid July 2025, the Eswatini government agreed to accept the deportation of five deportees from Jamaica, Laos, Cuba, Yemen and Vietnam, whose home countries had refused to repatriate them. According to Department of Homeland Security spokesperson Tricia McLaughlin, these prisoners had been convicted of serious crimes including various child rape, murder and robbery. Eswatini acting government spokesperson Thabile Mdluli said that his government would collaborate with the United States and the International Organization for Migration (IOM) to ensure that the five deportees were repatriated to their countries of origin. The five detainees were held in solitary confinement by Eswatini authorities.

==== Lesotho ====
During his speech to a joint session of Congress in March 2025, Trump said that the United States had previously spent $8 million "to promote LGBTQI+ in the African nation of Lesotho, which nobody has ever heard of." Lesotho criticized the remarks, calling them "quite insulting."

==== South Africa ====
Avatar of Secretary Marco Rubio

Secretary Marco Rubio
(@SecRubio)
tweeted:

English:

I will NOT attend the G20 summit in Johannesburg.

South Africa is doing very bad things. Expropriating private property. Using G20 to promote "solidarity, equality, & sustainability." In other words: DEI and climate change.

My job is to advance America's national interests, not waste taxpayer money or coddle anti-Americanism.

February 5, 2025

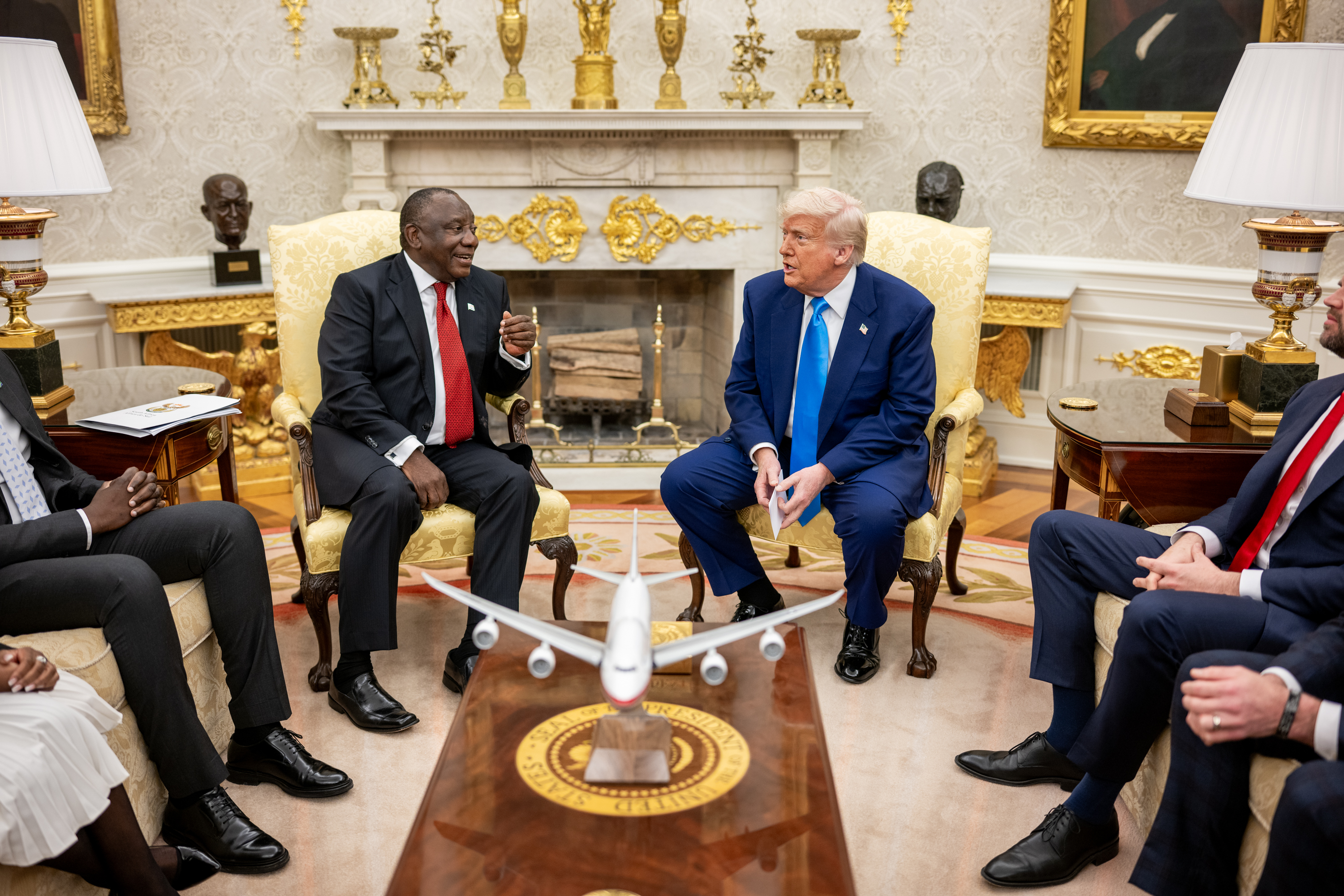
Trump and South African president Cyril Ramaphosa, May 2025

On February 6, 2025, Rubio announced that he would not attend the G20 summit in Johannesburg, citing South Africa's "controversial land expropriation law" as one of his reasons. The following day, Trump issued an executive order to suspend any aid or assistance to South Africa, citing South Africa's expropriation law which allegedly discriminated against Afrikaners. In that same executive order, he said that the U.S. would promote the resettlement of "Afrikaner refugees escaping government-sponsored race-based discrimination, including racially discriminatory property confiscation," and grant Afrikaners rapid pathways to citizenship.

In response, South African Department of International Relations and Cooperation spokesperson Chrispin Phiri denounced the decision, saying it was insensitive towards South Africa's historical experience with colonialism and Apartheid and added it was based on misinformation and propaganda. During his annual State of the Nation Address, South African president Cyril Ramaphosa reiterated that South Africa "will not be intimidated or pushed around." In early February 2025, Reuters reported that Errol Musk had arranged a phone call between Ramaphosa and Trump ally Elon Musk in response to the suspension of US aid to South Africa.

In early March 2025, Ramaphosa issued a statement rejecting "counterproductive megaphone diplomacy" after Trump published a social media post reiterating his earlier claim that South Africa was confiscating land from farmers.

Later in March 2025, the Trump administration declared South African Ambassador Ebrahim Rasool persona non grata, ordering him to leave the U.S. by March 21. The decision, announced by Rubio on social media before formal notification, followed remarks Rasool made in a webinar criticizing U.S. policies. South Africa objected to the manner of the expulsion, accusing the U.S. of bypassing diplomatic channels, while Ramaphosa downplayed the issue, calling it a "hiccup" in U.S.-South Africa relations.

The first group of 59 White South African refugees arrived in Dulles, Virginia on May 12, 2025. On May 21, Trump hosted Ramaphosa and a large South African delegation during an Oval Office meeting and press conference. This meeting covered several controversial issues including South African land reform policies and farm attacks. During the meeting, President Trump raised concerns raised by US officials and advocacy groups about South Africa's land expropriation policies. President Ramaphosa responded by reaffirming South Africa's commitment to a constitutional and lawful process of land reform aimed at addressing historical inequalities, while ensuring food security and protecting property rights.

A November 2025 post from Trump stated "at my direction, South Africa will NOT be receiving an invitation to the 2026 G20, (...) South Africa has demonstrated to the World they are not a country worthy of Membership anywhere, and we are going to stop all payments and subsidies to them, effective immediately."

=== West Africa ===
==== Ghana ====
In September 2025, Ghana agreed to accept 14 West African deportees from the United States, including nationals from Togo, Liberia and Gambia who had been convicted of various crimes including robbery, assault and fraud. Ghanaian president John Mahama had agreed to accept a US invitation to accept the deportees on the grounds there was free movement of people in West Africa. Ghanaian foreign minister Samuel Okudzeto Ablakwa said that Ghana had not received a financial reward for accepting the deportees. In early October 2025, 11 of the 14 deportees sued the Ghanaian government for unlawful detention and alleged that Ghana had dumped them in neighbouring Togo and left them to fend for themselves. The opposition New Patriotic Party's spokesperson Samuel Abu Jinapor called for the suspension of Ghana's deportation agreement with the United States, claiming that it violated the Ghanaian Constitution's Article 75 requiring that international agreements be ratified by the Parliament of Ghana.

==== Nigeria ====
In mid July 2025, Nigerian Foreign Minister Yusuf Tuggar criticized the United States for using tariffs and the tightening of visas to exert pressure on Nigeria and other African states to accept foreign deportees including Venezuelans who had been deported from the US. In response, the United States Mission in Nigeria said that US visa policy changes were not result of any nation's stance on third-country origins but were motivated by a desire to safeguard US immigration systems.

Avatar of Donald J. Trump

Donald J. Trump
(@realDonaldTrump)
tweeted:

English:

If the Nigerian Government continues to allow the killing of Christians, the U.S.A. will immediately stop all aid and assistance to Nigeria, and may very well go into that now disgraced country, "guns-a-blazing," to completely wipe out the Islamic Terrorists who are committing these horrible atrocities. I am hereby instructing our Department of War to prepare for possible action. If we attack, it will be fast, vicious, and sweet, just like the terrorist thugs attack our CHERISHED Christians! WARNING: THE NIGERIAN GOVERNMENT BETTER MOVE FAST!

November 1, 2025

Between late October and early November 2025, Donald Trump threatened military action against Nigeria in response to the events taking place in Nigeria. Trump, claiming violent killings of Christians and violations of religious freedom in Nigeria, has ordered the US Department of Defense to prepare for military action against Islamist militant groups in Nigeria. According to reports, Nigeria has long been the target of terrorist attacks by the extremist group Boko Haram, attacks that occur mostly in northern Nigeria, where the majority is Muslim. Also, according to reports from human rights groups, there is no evidence that only Christians are subject to violent attacks, and both religious groups, Muslims and Christians, face insecurity. Nigerian president Bola Ahmed Tinubu rejected Trump's accusation and spoke of the Nigerian government's efforts to protect its citizens regardless of religion. In December 2025, the United States launched dozens of Tomahawk missiles against Islamic State targets in northwestern Nigeria, emphasizing the alleged killings of Christians by Islamist militants as a primary reason for the strikes. The government of Nigeria confirmed cooperating in the strikes but had denied Donald Trump's claims that Christians are the sole targets, claiming multiple communities suffer under extremist violence in the region.

In mid-February 2026, the United States dispatched 100 soldiers in mid-February 2026 to provide training, technical and intelligence support to Nigerian forces combating Islamic militants and other armed groups.

=== Mali ===
In early 2026, the administration sought to restore intelligence gathering operations in Mali, a deal that also involved lifting sanctions against the nation's defense minister and two other senior officials who were allegedly connected to Russian mercenaries. In July, the administration was considering taking military action against JNIM, a group affiliated with Al-Qaeda that has launched attacks in Mali and other West African countries.

== Asia ==
=== Caucasus & the Middle East ===
==== Armenia and Azerbaijan ====
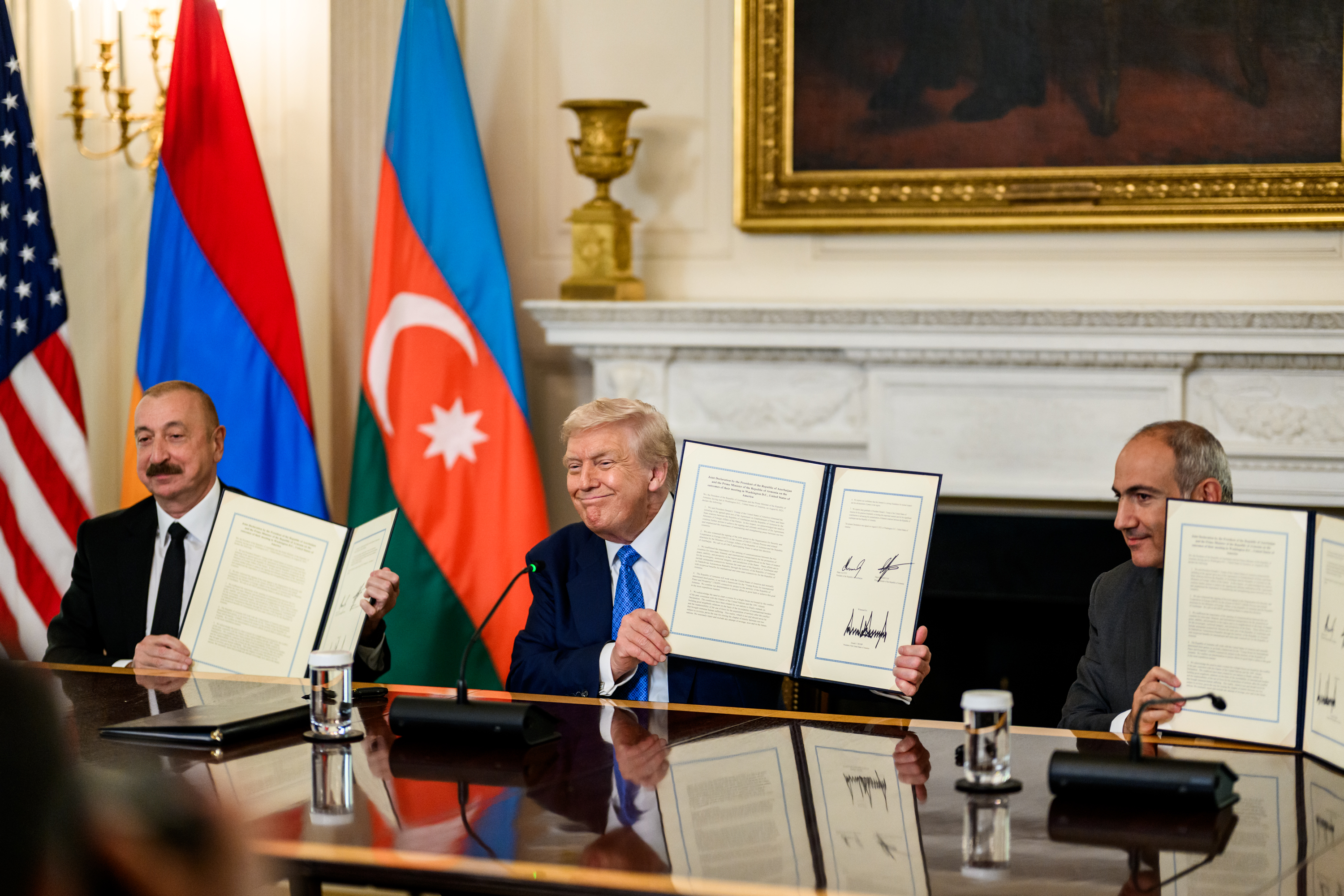
Trump signs the agreements, alongside Azerbaijani president Ilham Aliyev and Armenian prime minister Nikol Pashinyan in the State Dining Room, August 8, 2025

On April 24, 2025, during the first Armenian Genocide Remembrance Day of Trump's second term, the White House issued a statement commemorating the day that did not use the term "genocide". This was seen as a reversal after Joe Biden formally recognized the Armenian genocide in 2021. The second Trump administration continues to avoid using the term "genocide", instead continuing to refer to the events as the Medz Yeghern (Armenian for 'Great Catastrophe') and labeling April 24 as only "Armenian Remembrance Day".

On August 8, 2025, Armenian prime minister Nikol Pashinyan and Azerbaijani president Ilham Aliyev signed a peace agreement in a ceremony hosted by Trump at the White House, ending an over 35-year conflict between Armenia and Azerbaijan. The agreement also granted the United States development rights for the corridor, which will be operated under Armenian law and subleased to a consortium—moves analysts say could "unlock the region" and pave the way for Azerbaijan's possible entry into the Abraham Accords.

==== Egypt ====
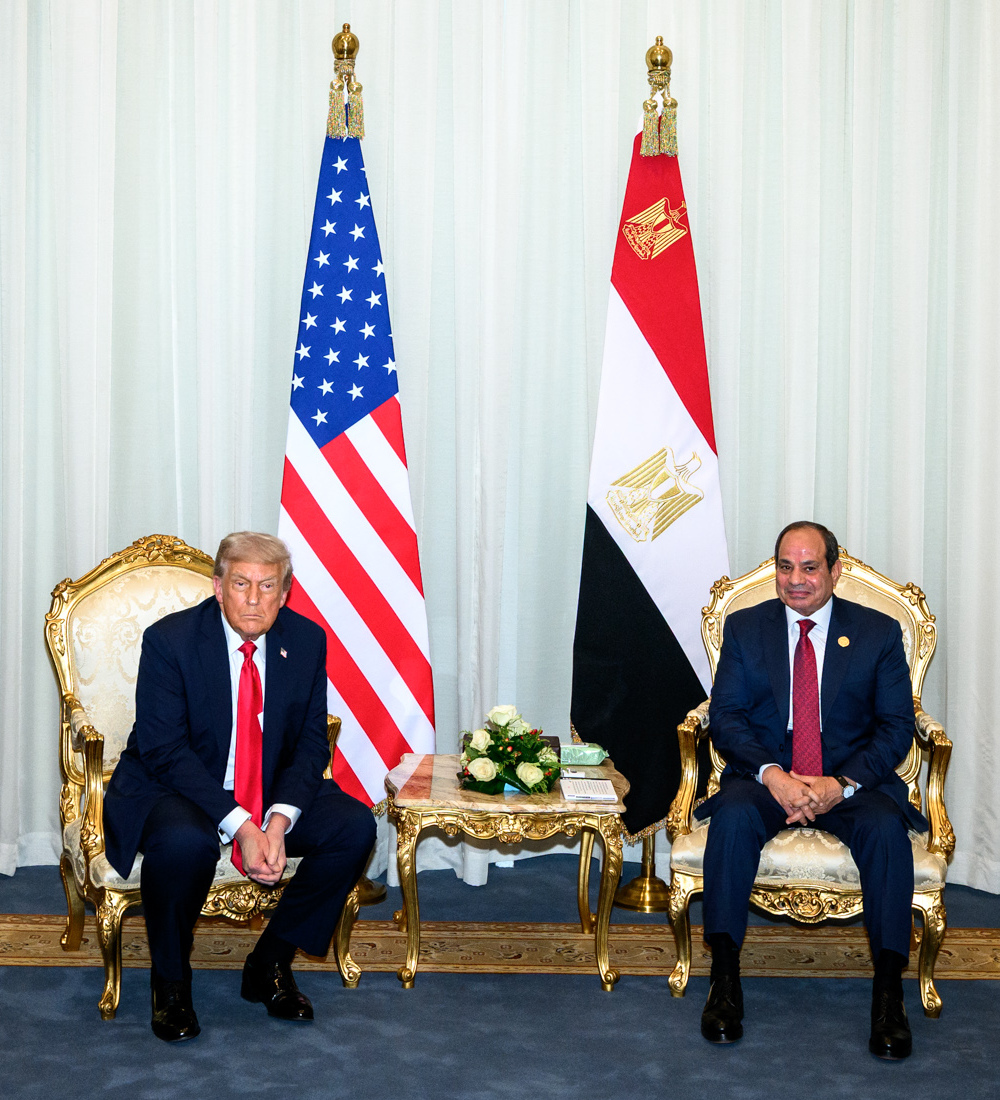
Trump and Egyptian President Abdel Fattah el-Sisi in Sharm El Sheikh, October 2025

In February 2025, Trump proposed that the United States take over the Gaza Strip after relocating all Palestinians to Egypt and Jordan. He threatens Egypt with cutting off American aid if the country refuses his plan. In March 2025, Egypt proposed its own plan to rebuild the Gaza Strip, involving the United Nations and the Palestinian Authority. The Egyptian plan is rejected by the Trump administration.

==== Iran ====
Major U.S. military bases and installations in the Middle East, including facilities used during the 2026 U.S.-Israeli strikes against Iran.

Trump, in March 2026, "We're roaming free. We can do whatever we want. And as you know, today we were going to have the privilege of shooting down a very big electric generation plant, one of the biggest in the world." (at 20:20) "And we literally have planes flying over Tehran and other parts of their country, they can't do a thing about it. For instance, if I want to take down that power plant, that very big, powerful power plant, they can't do a thing about it. It's like, take me, that's all they can do." (at 34:43)

In March 2025, US Director of National Intelligence, Tulsi Gabbard, testified that the US intelligence community, "continues to assess Iran is not building a nuclear weapon and Supreme Leader Khamenei has not authorized a nuclear weapons program". In April 2025, Trump announced negotiations between the US and Iran regarding Iran's nuclear program. The White House declared that Iran had two months to secure a deal, which expired the day before Israel's strikes.

On June 13, 2025, Trump praised the Israeli strikes on Iran as "excellent" and "very successful". On June 22, 2025, the U.S. launched direct strikes on Iranian nuclear sites.

Following the ceasefire, Trump publicly rebuked Ali Khamenei's remarks saying Iran won the war with Israel, calling on Khamenei to "tell the truth, you got beat to hell". In addition, he warned that if Iran were to continue uranium enrichment, the U.S. would strike again.

During the 2025–2026 Iranian protests, Trump repeatedly threatened military strikes against Iran while called on Iranian protesters to keep protesting and taking over institutions, saying that "help is on its way". He warned the Iranian authorities that the U.S. would "intervene" if the regime did not halt its crackdown on protesters. On January 17, 2026, Trump floated the idea of regime change in Iran, saying that it is "time to look for new leadership" and called Khamenei "a sick man". In mid-January 2026, reports emerged that Iranian foreign minister Abbas Araghchi sent a personal message to Steve Witkoff stating that Iran had canceled the planned execution of 800 anti-regime protesters. This communication is said to have been instrumental in persuading Trump to refrain from ordering immediate military strikes against Iran.

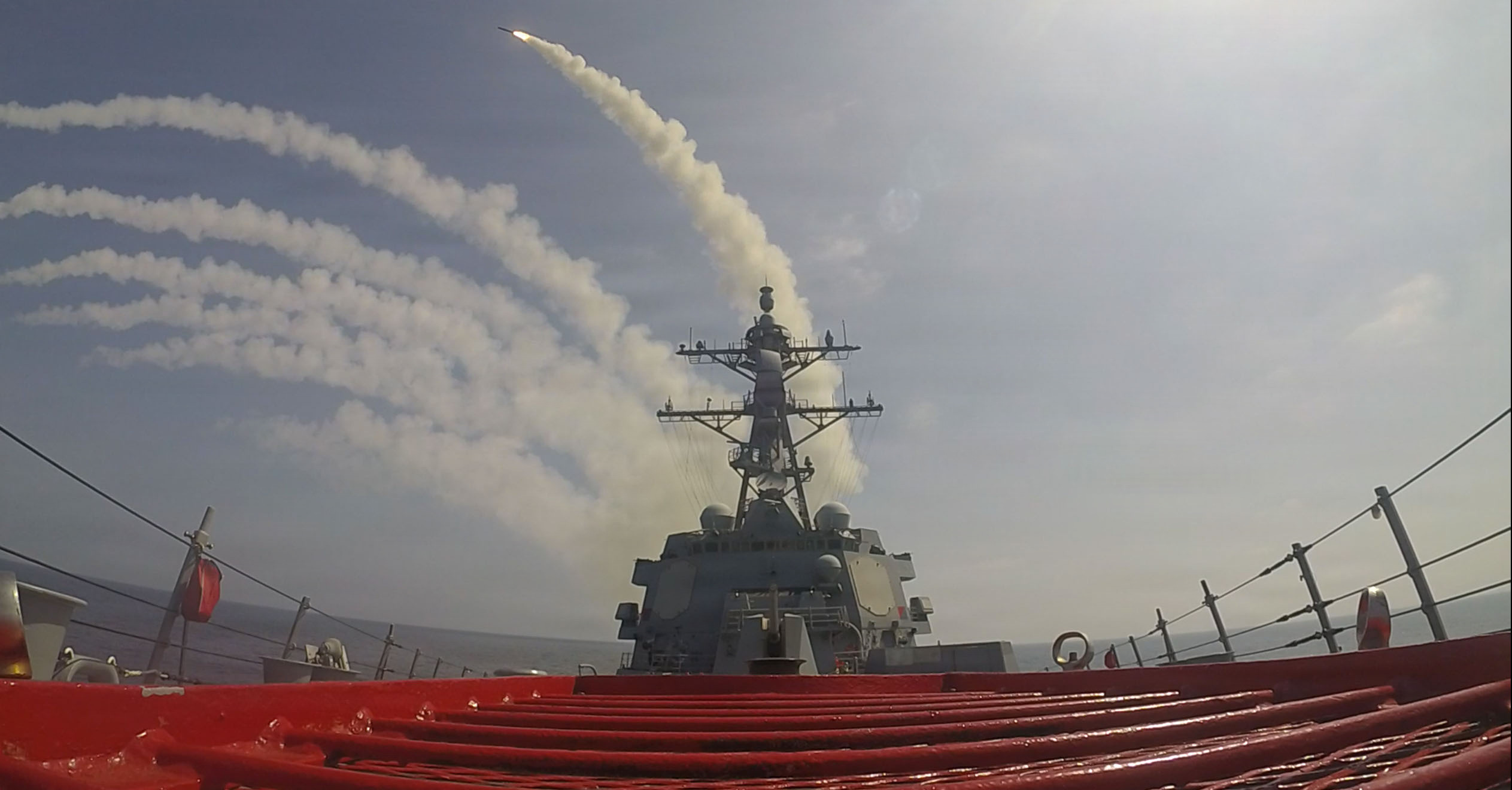
USS Frank E. Petersen Jr. fires a Tomahawk missile during Operation Epic Fury on February 28, 2026

In early 2026, the United States and Iran engaged in high-stakes negotiations led by Steve Witkoff and Presidential Advisor Jared Kushner. On February 28, 2026, the U.S. and Israeli militaries launched joint strikes on Iran, which later escalated to a regional war, with the stated goal of regime change. Oman's Foreign Minister and lead mediator Badr bin Hamad Al Busaidi claimed the United States had "lost control of its own foreign policy" and accused Israel of persuading the Trump administration to engage in a war with Iran, which he termed a "grave miscalculation" and a "catastrophe".

Rubio claimed that the Strait of Hormuz was “the equivalent of an economic nuclear weapon” for Iran.

Iran then rejected several of Trump's peace proposals upon Trump's departure to the People's Republic of China, while claiming that only PRC's proposals were worth an effort.

Trump then rejected an Iranian offer at the end of september.

==== Iraq ====
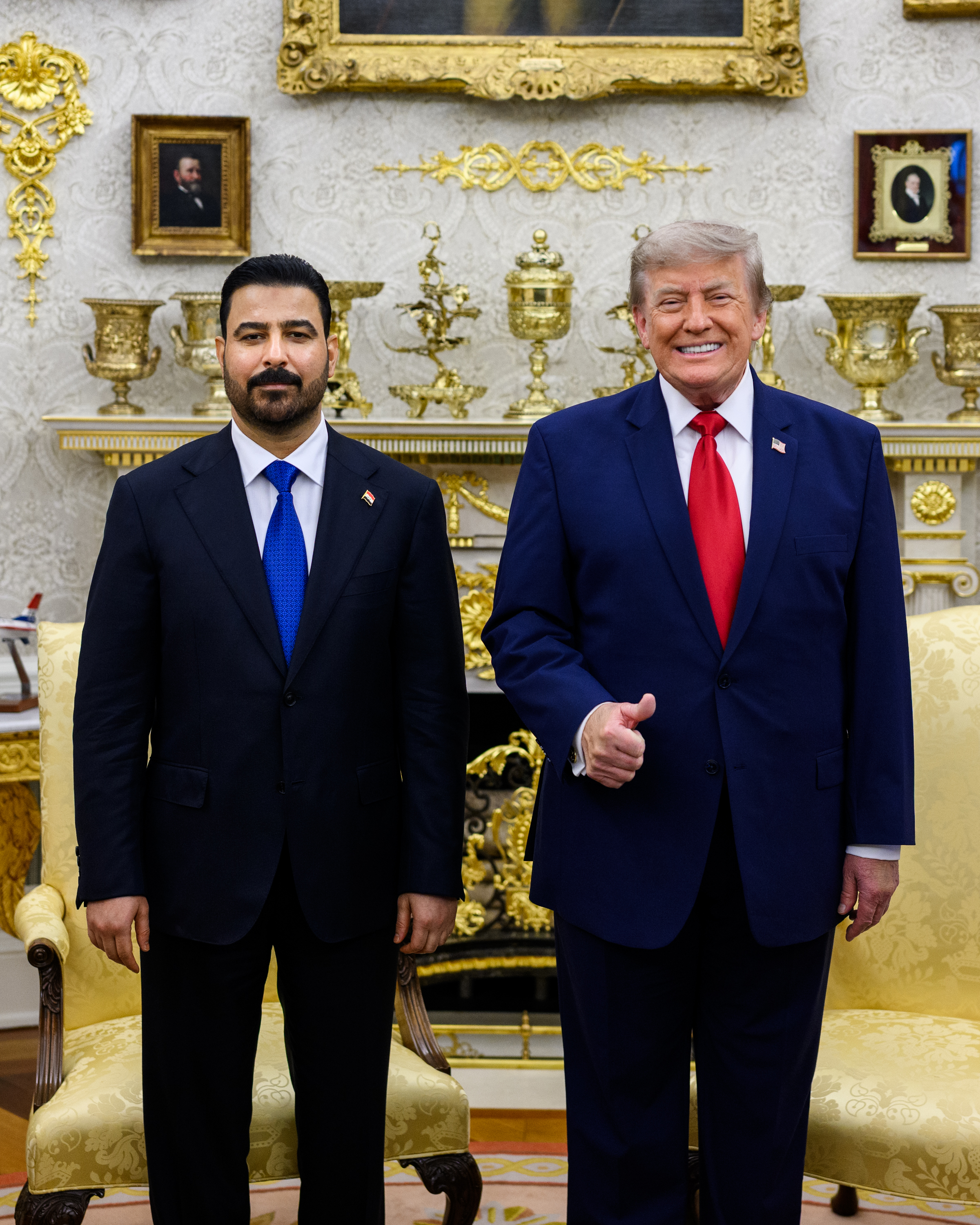
Trump and Iraqi prime minister Ali al-Zaidi, July 2026

In July 2026, Trump met with Iraqi prime minister Ali al-Zaidi regarding business and oil deals. It was announced that the U.S. plans to end its military presence in Iraq by September.

==== Israel and Palestine ====
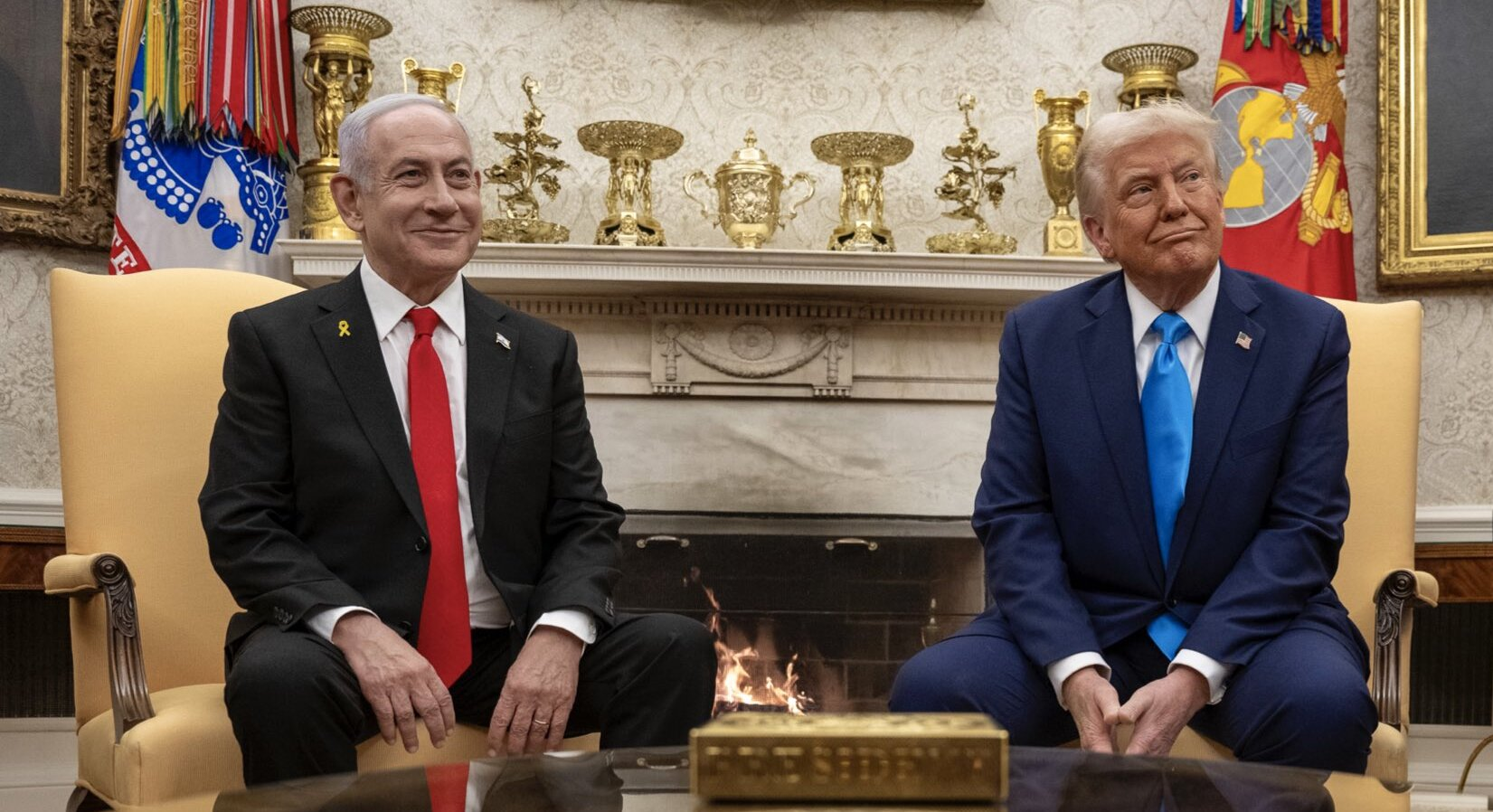
Trump and Israeli prime minister Benjamin Netanyahu, February 2025

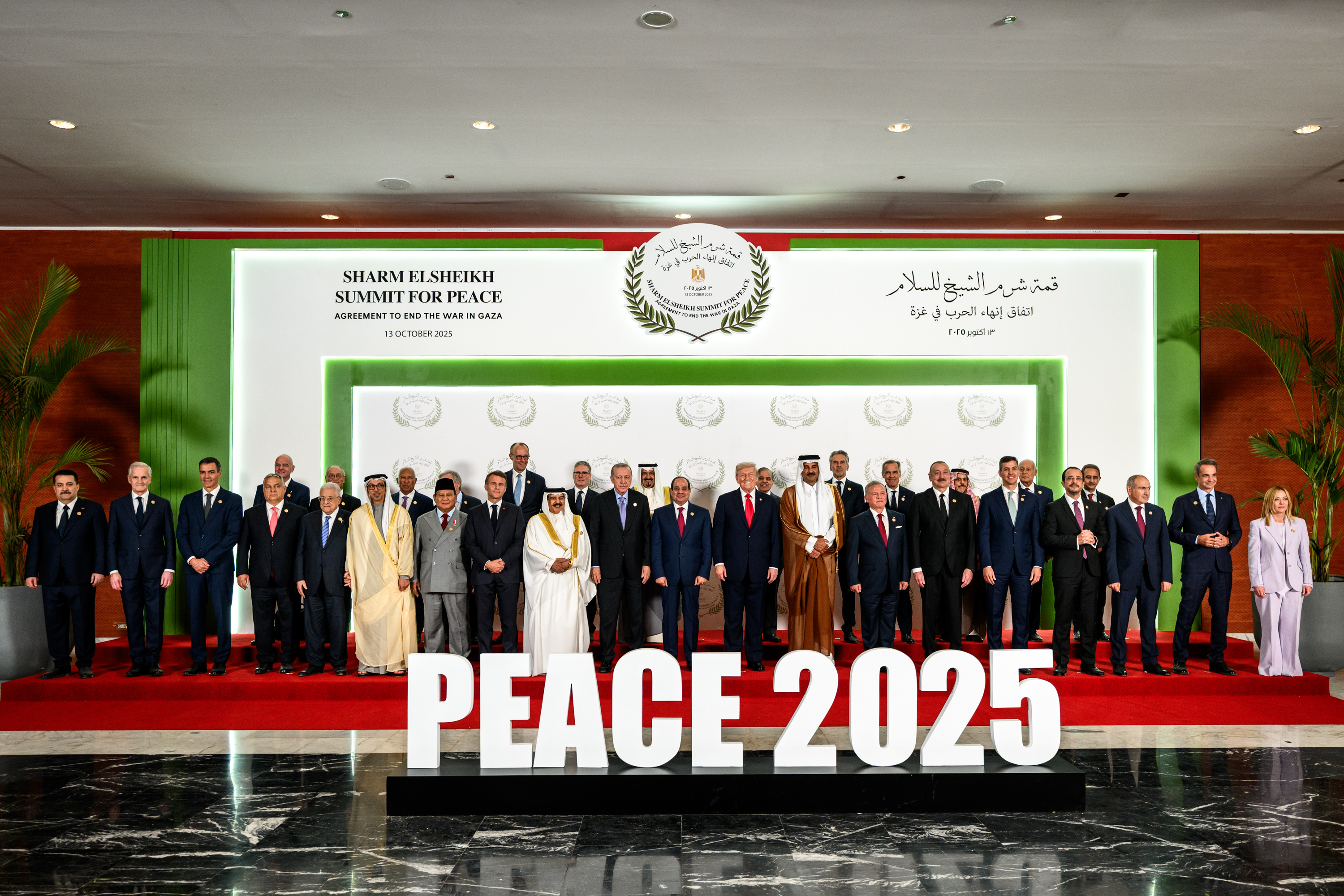
Trump at the Gaza peace summit in Sharm El Sheikh, Egypt, on October 13, 2025

Trump has taken a pro-Israel stance and increased support for Israel in the Gaza war. Israeli-American billionaire Miriam Adelson supported Trump in the 2024 United States presidential election. Adelson sought support from candidate Trump for Israel's annexation of the West Bank, pledging more than $100 million to Trump's campaign in exchange for U.S. recognition of Israel's sovereignty over the region.

In January 2025, the Times of Israel reported that Adelson gave Trump's campaign at least $100 million in October 2024.

The administration reportedly lifted sanctions on the individual who was alleged to have killed Awdah Hathaleen.

Trump delivers remarks to The Knesset including calling for Netanyahu to be pardoned

A 2025 letter from Trump to Israeli president Isaac Herzog stated that "it is time" for Netanyahu be pardoned. Previously, in a speech before the Knesset, Trump had also called for Netanyahu to be pardoned.

In 2025, Ambassador Mike Huckabee reportedly met with Jonathan Pollard.

In March 2026, the administration filed to intervene in South Africa's genocide case against Israel, "To avoid any doubt, the United States affirms, in the strongest terms possible, that the allegations of "genocide" against Israel are false."

The 2026 Iran War was described as "the first time" the US went to war with Israel.

In November 2026, Trump announced that the US will terminate all military aid to Israel, totaling $4 billion per year, by the end of 2026, but will continue to sell military hardware.

===== Ceasefire achieved =====
In his first term, Trump was considered one of the most pro-Israel presidents of the United States. During his 2024 presidential campaign, Trump urged Israeli prime minister Benjamin Netanyahu to end the war in Gaza within two months and opened the door to attacks on Iran's nuclear facilities. Trump warned Hamas that they would have "all hell to pay" if the war did not end before he took office in January. Following the election, Trump spoke with Palestinian president Mahmoud Abbas for the first time since 2017. During their phone call, Trump expressed his desire to quickly end the war in Gaza.

Trump's son-in-law and former White House senior advisor Jared Kushner is expected to play a key role in the future United States' Middle East policy as an outside presidential adviser. Being pro-Israel and having ties with several Arab leaders, Kushner previously helped to broker the Abraham Accords during Trump's first presidency. Most of Trump's advisors and appointees are considered staunch supporters of the Jewish state, including Pete Hegseth, Mike Huckabee, Robert F. Kennedy Jr., John Ratcliffe, Rubio, Elise Stefanik, and Michael Waltz. Lebanese-American businessman Massad Boulos, who was appointed as a senior advisor on Arab and Middle Eastern Affairs and has ties with Lebanese politicians, is viewed as an intermediary between Trump and Arab leaders. While Special Envoy for the Middle East Steve Witkoff is expected to deal with Israel, Boulos will help in negotiations with the Arab world. Days before the inauguration of the administration, a ceasefire agreement was reached between Israel and Hamas. Trump and Biden both claimed credit for the ceasefire deal, with the former describing it as "EPIC". Several media sources, including Haaretz and The Times of Israel, credited Trump and Witkoff as responsible.

In early February 2025, after talks with Israeli prime minister Benjamin Netanyahu, Trump announced that the U.S. would "take over" and "own" the Gaza Strip, suggesting the forced relocation of Palestinians and its redevelopment. 2025 Donald Trump Gaza Strip takeover proposal sparked international backlash, with the UN condemning it as ethnic cleansing, Arab nations rejecting it over regional stability concerns, and human rights groups calling it a war crime. Netanyahu praised the plan. Amid mounting pressure, Trump later stated that the U.S. would not enforce the takeover but would recommend it as a solution.

===== Collapse of the ceasefire =====
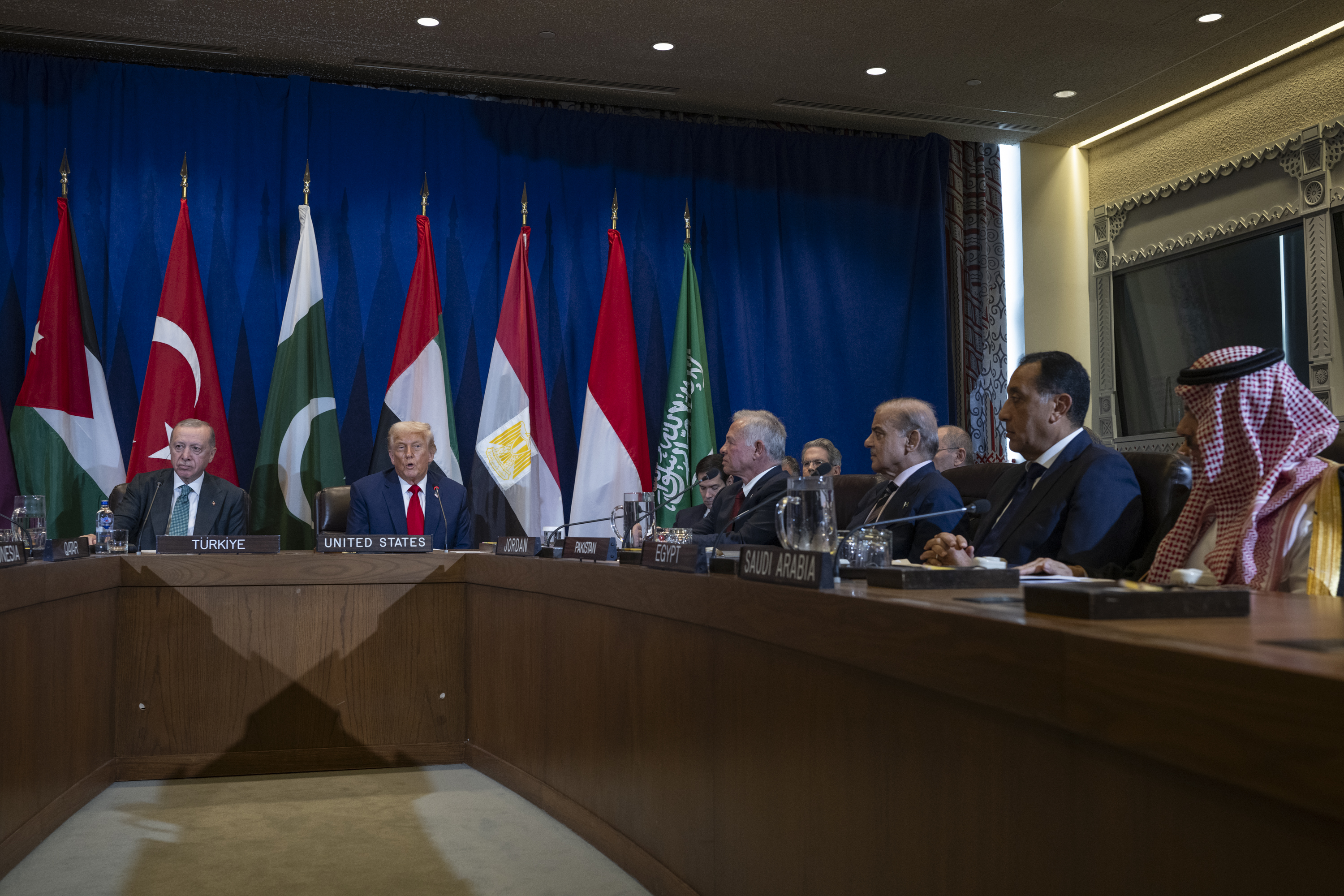
Trump with Muslim leaders on the sidelines of the eightieth session of the United Nations General Assembly to discuss the Gaza war

In March 2025, Israel, with Trump administration backing, launched airstrikes on Gaza, killing over 400 and ending a ceasefire. The strikes followed a dispute over hostage releases, with Israel demanding Hamas free half of the remaining hostages before extending the truce, while Hamas insisted on continuing negotiations and adhering to the original ceasefire agreement of January 2025. The White House confirmed Israel consulted Trump beforehand, and Trump warned of severe consequences for Hamas. In response, Yemen's Houthis launched missiles at Israel, which were intercepted, while the U.S. struck Houthi targets in Yemen.

On July 28, 2025, Trump admitted that people in Gaza were starving and promised that the US and its allies would set up barrier-free food centers in Gaza to assist with humanitarian aid deliveries. On August 1, 2025, U.S. Ambassador to Israel Mike Huckabee and Special Envoy Steve Witkoff visited the GHS distribution center in Gaza.

The US Department of State announced in August 2025 it was suspending all visitor visas for Palestinians from Gaza following criticism from far-right political activist Laura Loomer. A group of Palestinians had been granted visas to enter the United States to obtain emergency medical treatment unavailable in Gaza due to the Gaza humanitarian crisis.

===== Gaza peace plan =====
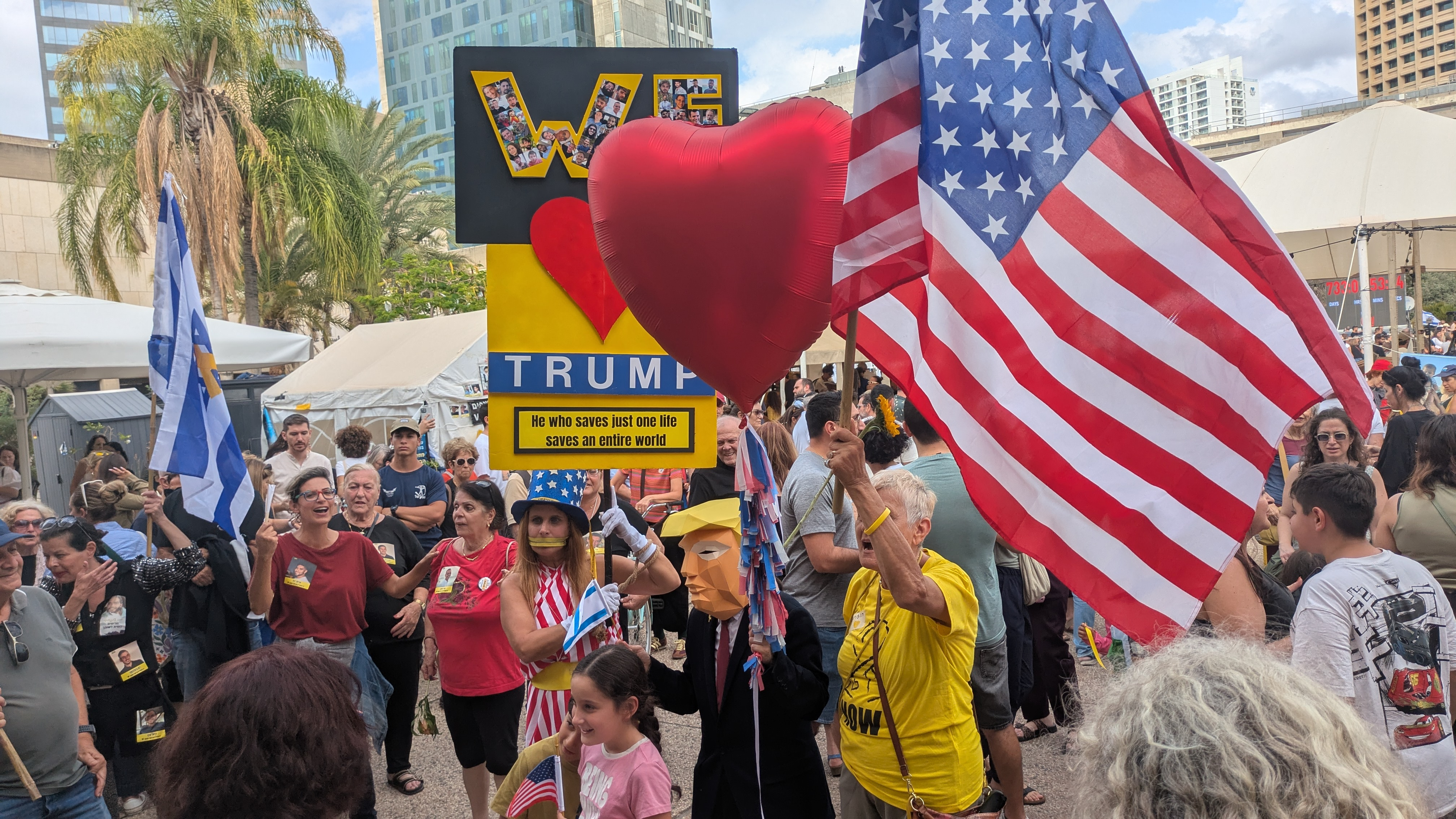
Hostages Square in Tel Aviv, October 9, 2025, following the announcement of the impending release of Israeli hostages.

On September 29, 2025, Trump announced, alongside Benjamin Netanyahu, a 20-Point Gaza Peace Plan from the White House which consisted of 20 specific points aimed at achieving a ceasefire, the return of Israeli hostages, dismantling Hamas's military capabilities, and establishing a transitional governance structure in the Gaza Strip.

In October 2025, President Trump announced his deal for a ceasefire between Israel and Hamas had been reached and that the remaining hostages would be released. After the ceasefire was made, the popularity of Donald Trump in the USA has risen.

On October 23, 2025, the Knesset passed a bill that would extend Israeli sovereignty to all Israeli settlements in the West Bank. The bill was condemned by Vice President JD Vance as a "very stupid political stunt" and by Secretary of State Marco Rubio as "counterproductive" to Trump's Gaza peace plan. Trump added that "Israel would lose all of its support from the United States if that happened."

==== Jordan ====
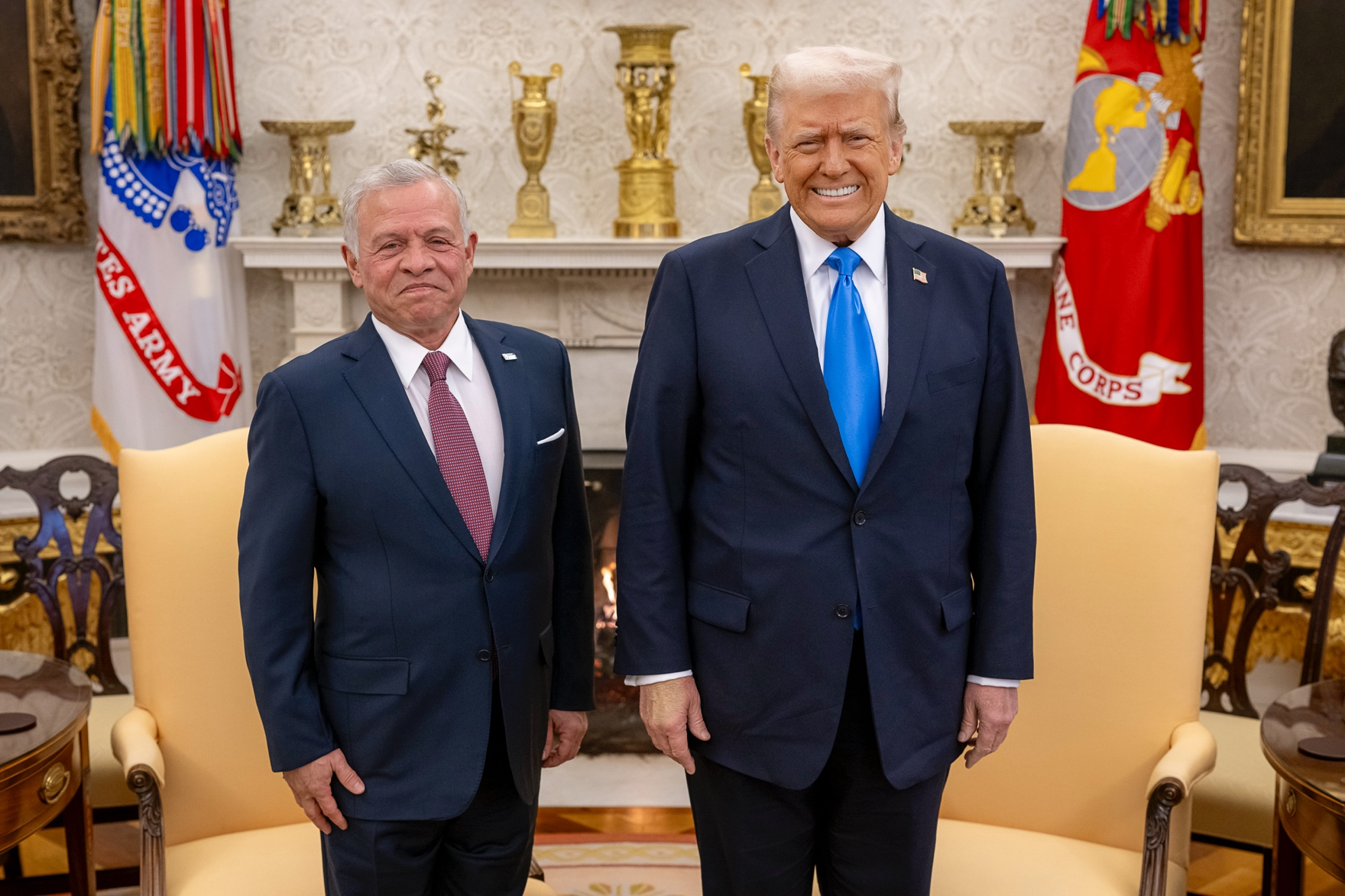
Trump and King Abdullah II of Jordan in February 2025

In February 2025, Trump proposed that the United States take over the Gaza Strip after relocating all Palestinians to Jordan and Egypt. He threatened to cut off American aid if Jordan refuses his plan.

==== Lebanon ====
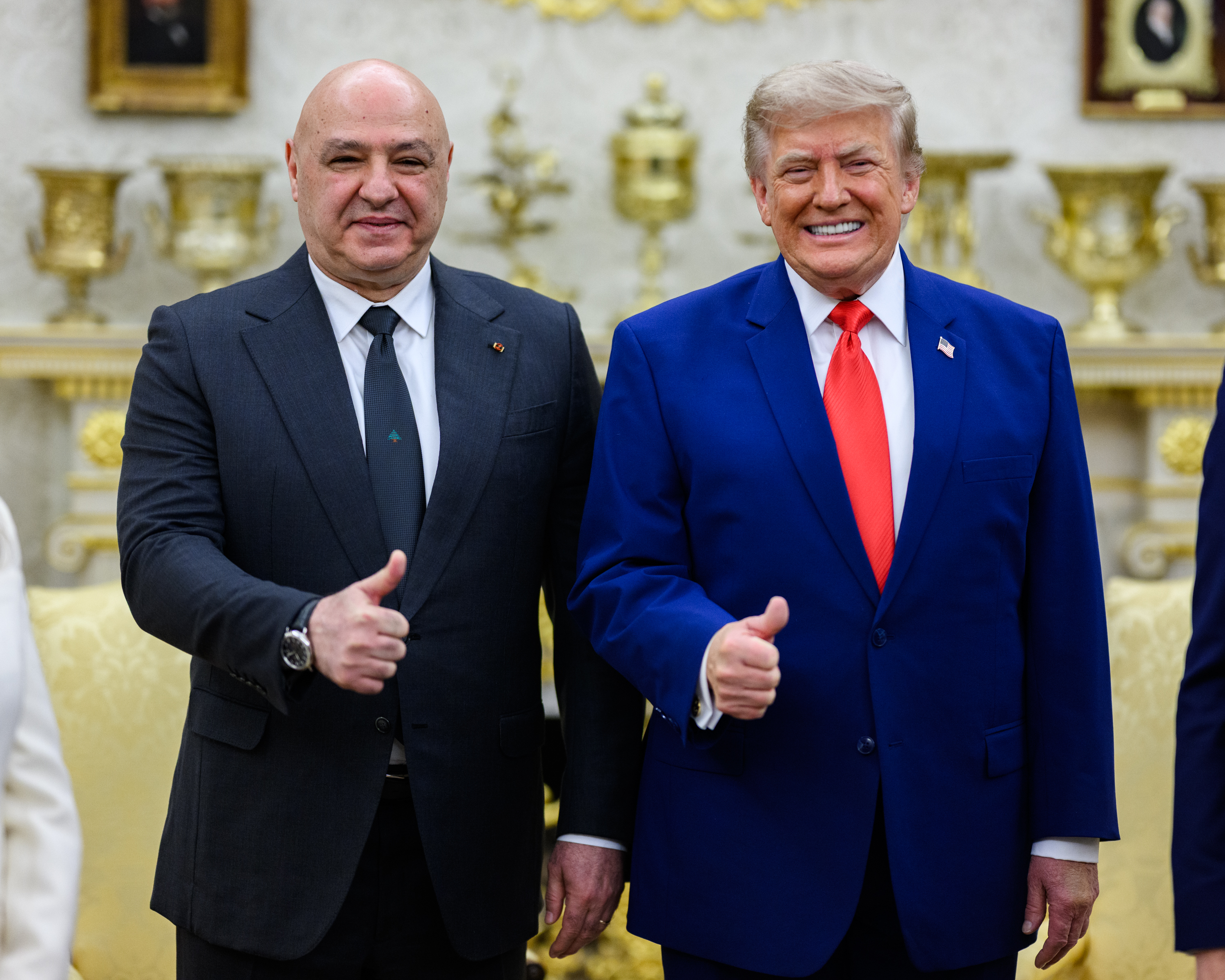
Trump and Lebanese president Joseph Aoun, July 2026

==== Saudi Arabia ====
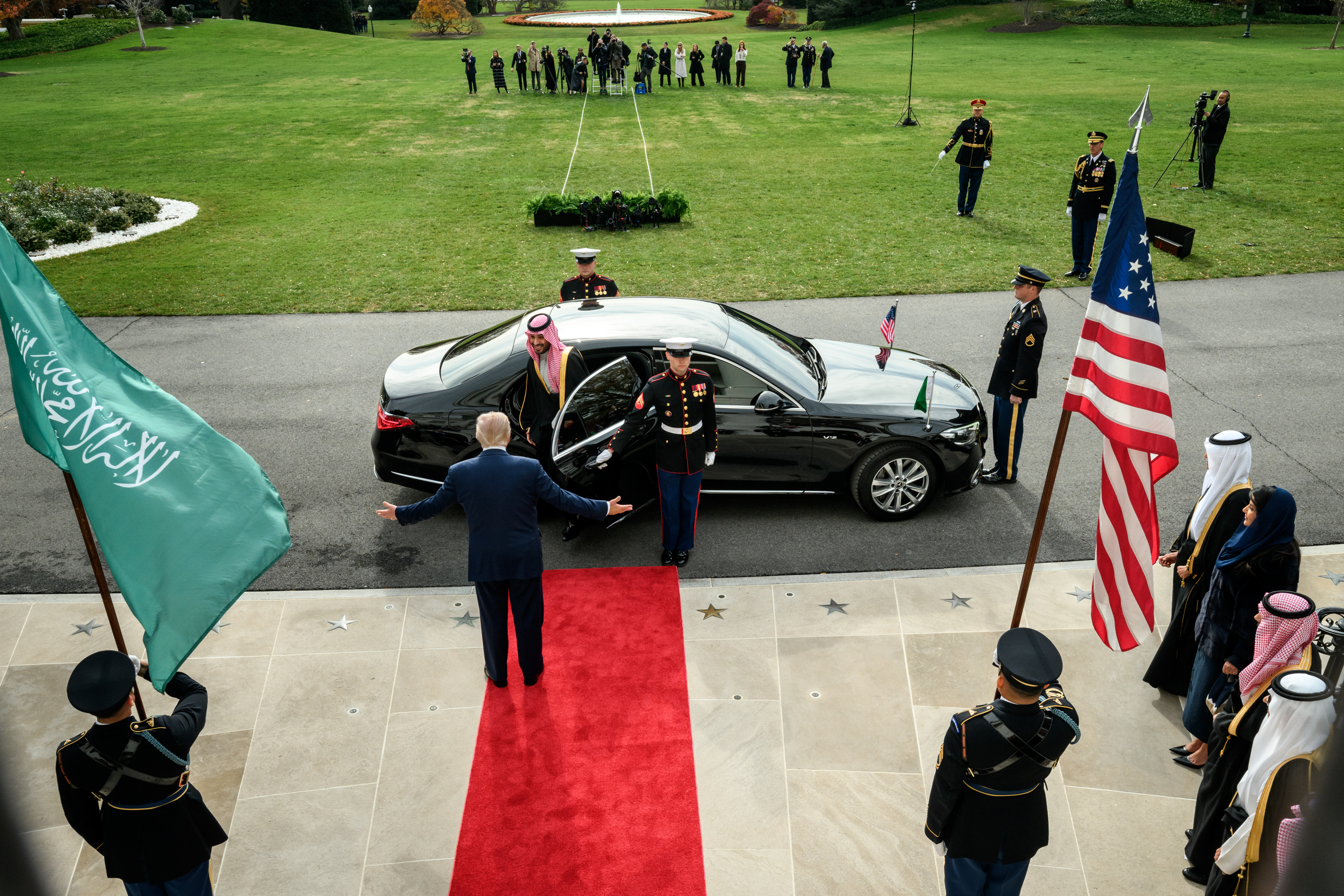
Trump welcomes MBS in 2025

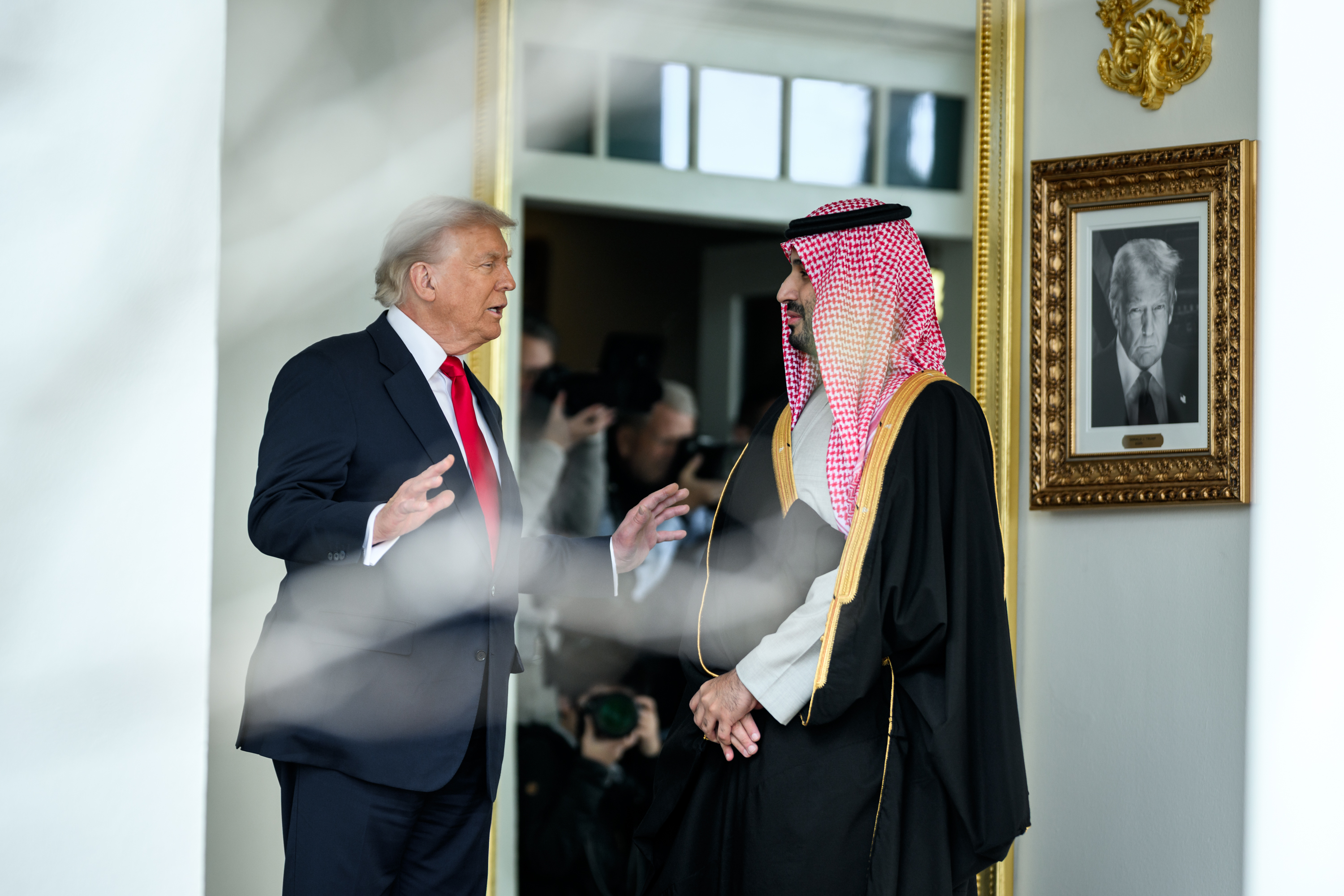
Trump speaks to MBS at the White House

Trump meeting with MBS

In 2025, Trump said "we'll be selling F-35s" to Saudi Arabia. During a 2025 visit by Saudi Crown Prince Mohammed bin Salman (MBS), about the Assassination of Jamal Khashoggi, Trump said "A lot of people didn't like that gentleman that you're talking about. Whether you like him or didn't like him, things happen, but he knew nothing about it. And would you leave it at that? You don't have to embarrass our guest by asking a question." Bader al-Asaker who was accused of being involved in the Saudi infiltration of Twitter was expected to join MBS on the visit. The Trump family's business ties to the kingdom have raised ethics concerns.

A dinner hosted by Trump for MBS was attended by Cristiano Ronaldo, Gianni Infantino, Elon Musk, Tim Cook, Michael Dell, Chuck Robbins, Jensen Huang, Lisa Su, David Ellison, Mike Wirth, Jane Fraser, Charles R. Schwab, Stephen A. Schwarzman, Brendan Bechtel, Mary Barra, William Clay Ford Jr., Bill McDermott, Eric Yuan, Marc Benioff, Sanjay Mehrotra, Cristiano Amon, Arvind Krishna, Ross Perot Jr., Bill Ackman, Greg Brockman, Jeremy Allaire, Brian Armstrong, Vlad Tenev, Charles Cascarilla, Kris Marszalek, Amin H. Nasser, Yasir Al-Rumayyan, Sarah Al-Suhaimi, Jeffrey Sprecher, Bret Baier, Maria Bartiromo, Albert Bourla, Bryson DeChambeau, Hala Altuwaijri, James Taiclet, Vimal Kapur, Larry Culp, Alex Karp, Jim Umpleby, Phebe Novakovic, Kathy Warden, Kelly Ortberg, Brian Mast, Scott O'Neil, Steve Wynn, Josh Harris, Lubna Al-Olayan, and Meredith O'Rourke.

==== Syria ====
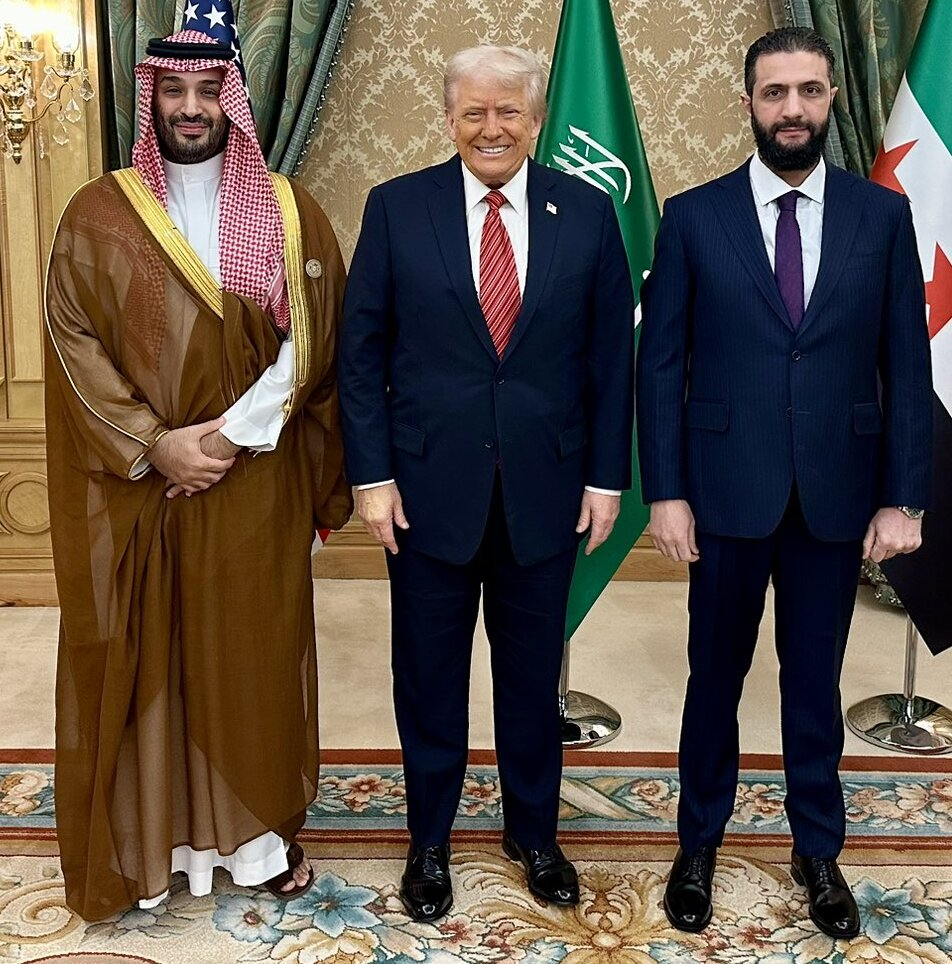
Trump with Crown Prince of Saudi Arabia Mohammed bin Salman and Syrian president Ahmed al-Sharaa in Riyadh, Saudi Arabia, May 14, 2025

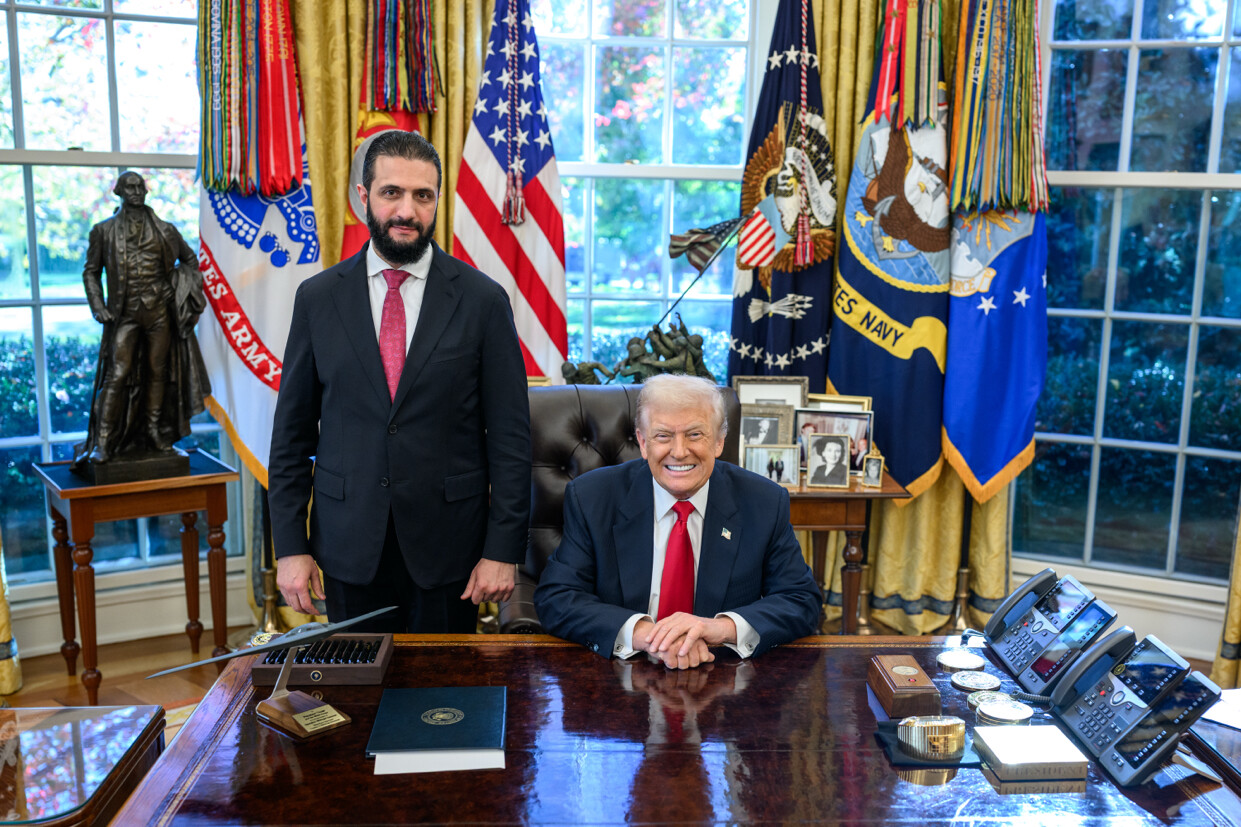
Trump with Syrian president Ahmed al-Sharaa in the Oval Office on November 10, 2025. The visit marked the first time a Syrian president had visited the White House since Syria gained independence in 1946.

In the Syrian civil war, the Syrian opposition launched an offensive against the pro-government Syrian Armed Forces in late November 2024, capturing the large cities of Aleppo and Hama. As opposition forces continued to close in on Damascus, Trump stated on December 7 that the U.S. should stay out of the conflict, stating "THIS IS NOT OUR FIGHT" in a social media post. Rebel groups captured Damascus the next day, December 8, as government forces surrendered and president Bashar al-Assad reportedly fled the country.

On January 30, 2025, the United States Central Command conducted an airstrike, killing senior Hurras al-Din operative Muhammad Salah al-Za'bir, inside Syria.

On March 9, 2025, Rubio condemned the massacres of Syrian minorities committed by pro-government fighters during clashes in western Syria in March 2025. He further indicated that "the United States stands with Syria's religious and ethnic minorities, including its Christian, Druze, Alawite, and Kurdish communities" and that the "perpetrators of these massacres against Syria's minority communities" should be held accountable.

In mid-May 2025, Trump met with Syrian president Ahmed al-Sharaa in Saudi Arabia, the first time that U.S. and Syrian leaders had met since a meeting was convened between Bill Clinton and Hafez al-Assad in Geneva in 2000. He announced he would remove sanctions for Syria and encouraged Syria to join the Abraham Accords.

On June 30, 2025, Trump signed an executive order officially removing sanctions for Syria while keeping sanctions for Assad and Ba'ath officials.

In November 2025, al-Sharaa visited the White House, marking the first time the U.S. has hosted a Syrian leader.

==== Turkey ====
Turkish President With U.S President In Istanbul

==== Qatar ====
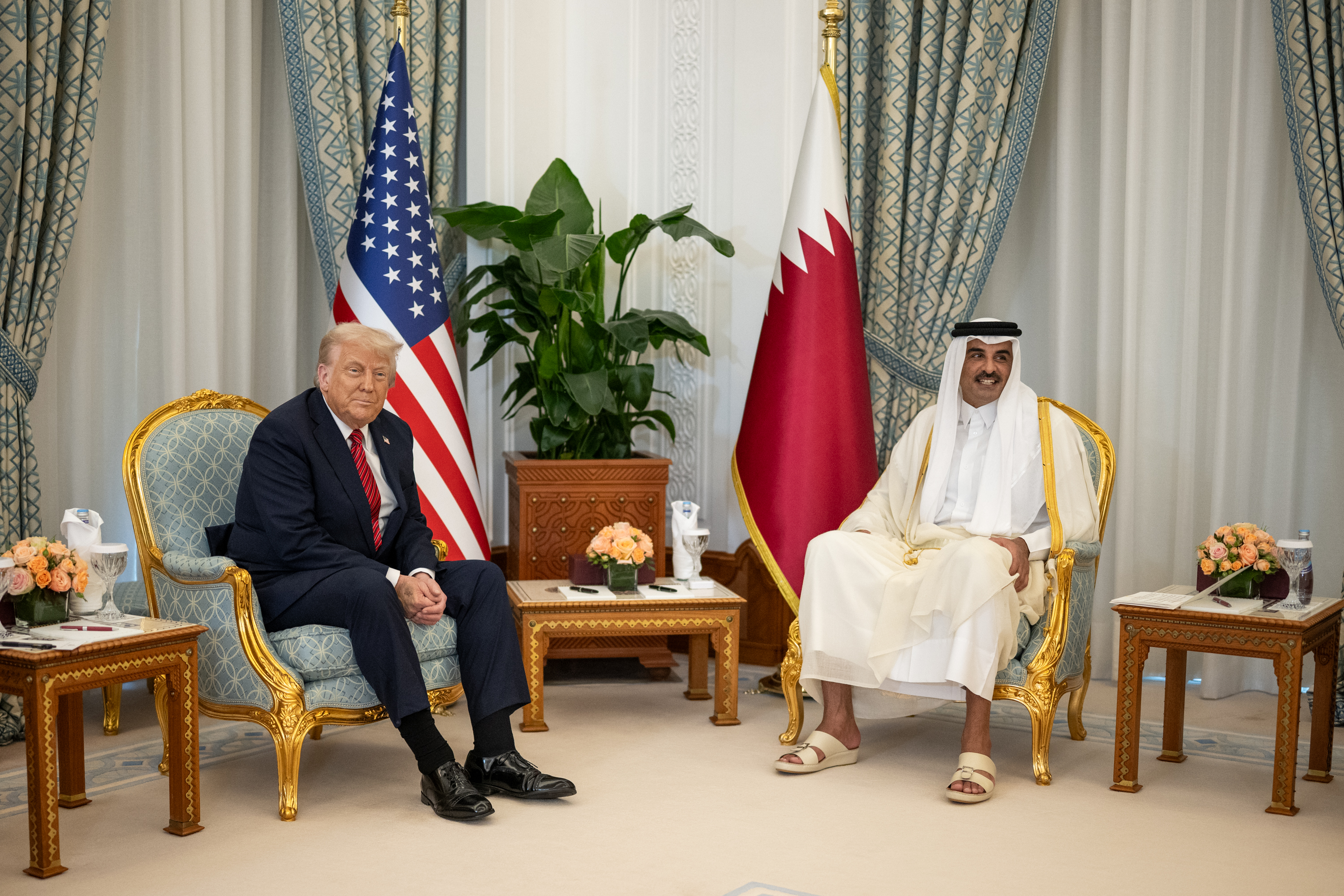
Trump and Emir Tamim bin Hamad Al Thani of Qatar, May 2025

In 2025, Trump received N7478D. Trump signed Executive Order 14353 (Assuring the Security of the State of Qatar) following the Israeli attack on Doha which states "The United States shall regard any armed attack on the territory, sovereignty, or critical infrastructure of the State of Qatar as a threat to the peace and security of the United States". In October 2025, Hegseth signed an agreement to build a Qatari Air Force Facility at the Mountain Home Air Force Base.

Pam Bondi, Mike Huckabee, Kash Patel, The Trump Organization, Jared Kushner, Susie Wiles Steve Witkoff and Lee Zeldin have had various ties with Qatar.

==== United Arab Emirates ====
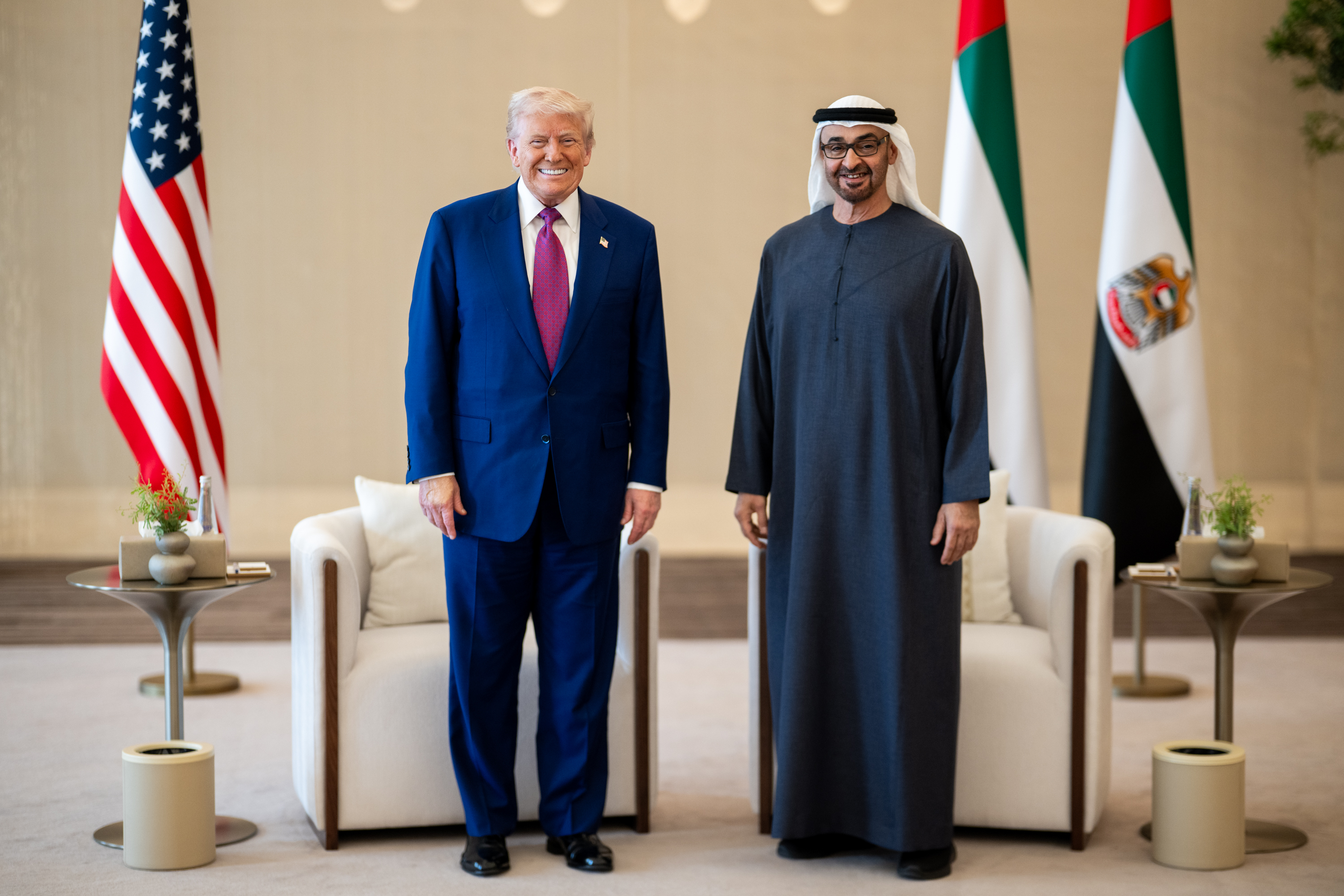
Trump and UAE President Mohamed bin Zayed Al Nahyan in Abu Dhabi during Donald Trump's visit to the Middle East, May 15, 2025

MGX Fund Management Limited chaired by Sheikh Tahnoon put $2 billion into World Liberty Financial to invest in binance. Two weeks later, Trump announced "over $200 billion in commercial deals between the United States and the United Arab Emirates—bringing the total of investment agreements in the Gulf region to over $2 trillion" Discussions reportedly involved David O. Sacks and Steve Witkoff.

==== Yemen ====
In what Amnesty International described as an indiscriminate attack, in 2025 the US conducted an airstrike on Saada prison.

==== Oman ====
Trump threatened to blow up Oman on May 27, 2026. He said: “Oman will behave just like everybody else, or we will have to blow them up.”

Trump reiterated his criticism against Oman concerning a pact with Iran in august 26 saying (that the U.S. would bomb Oman) if it “gets in the way,” using an expletive for emphasis.

=== East Asia ===
==== China, Taiwan, and the South China Sea ====
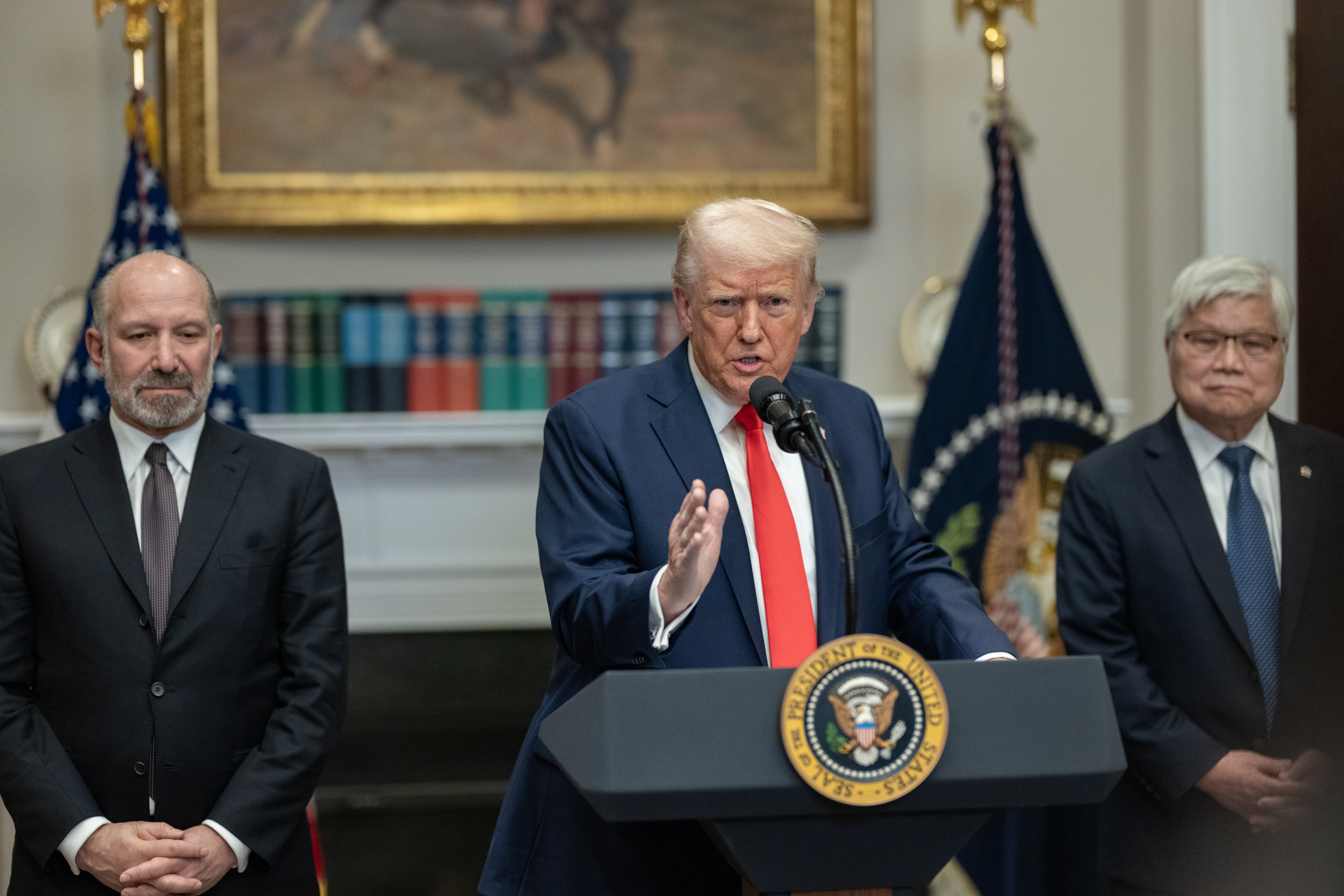
President Trump, standing next to C. C. Wei, announced that TSMC is set to invest in the U.S.

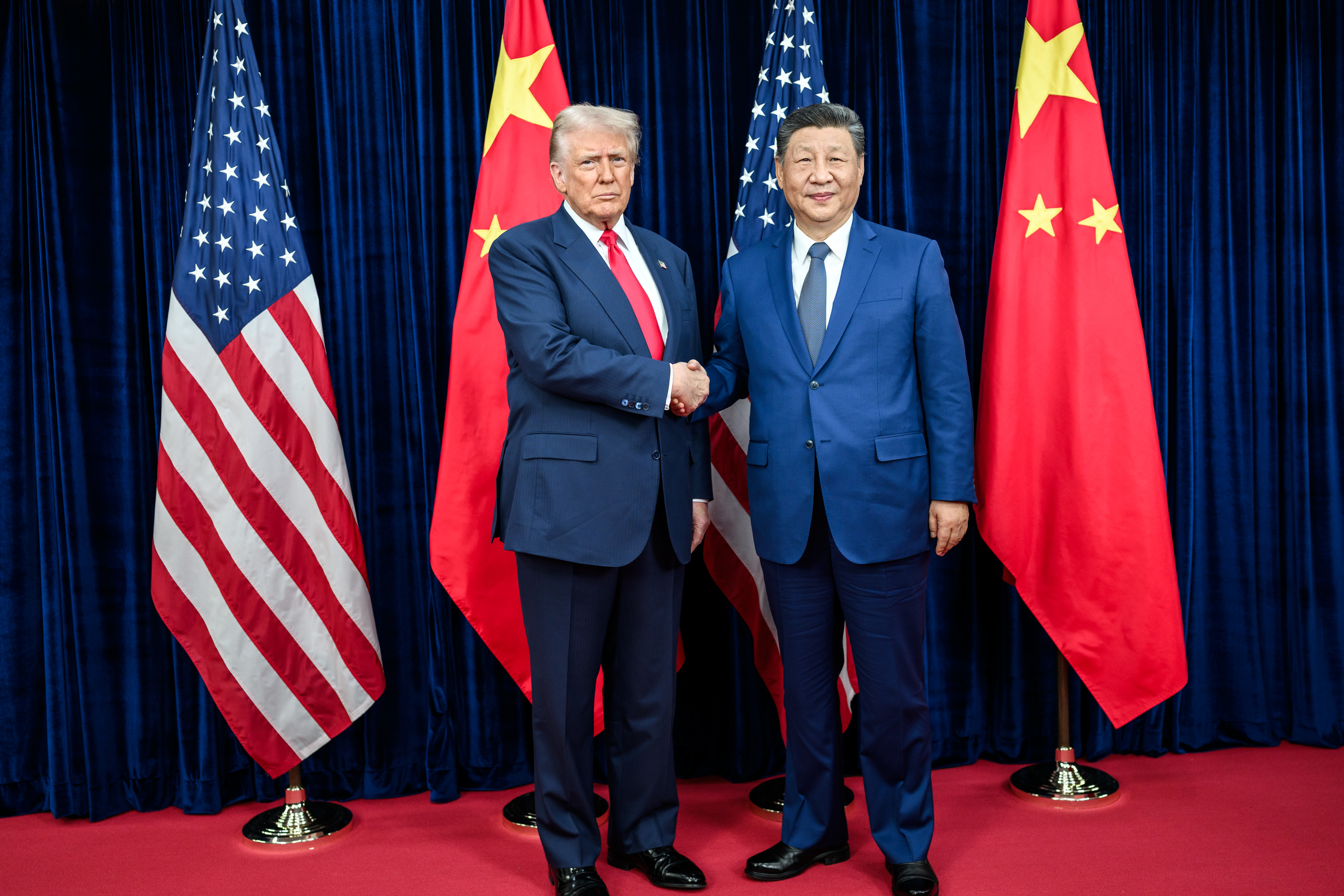
Trump and Chinese leader Xi Jinping at the Busan Summit in Busan, October 2025

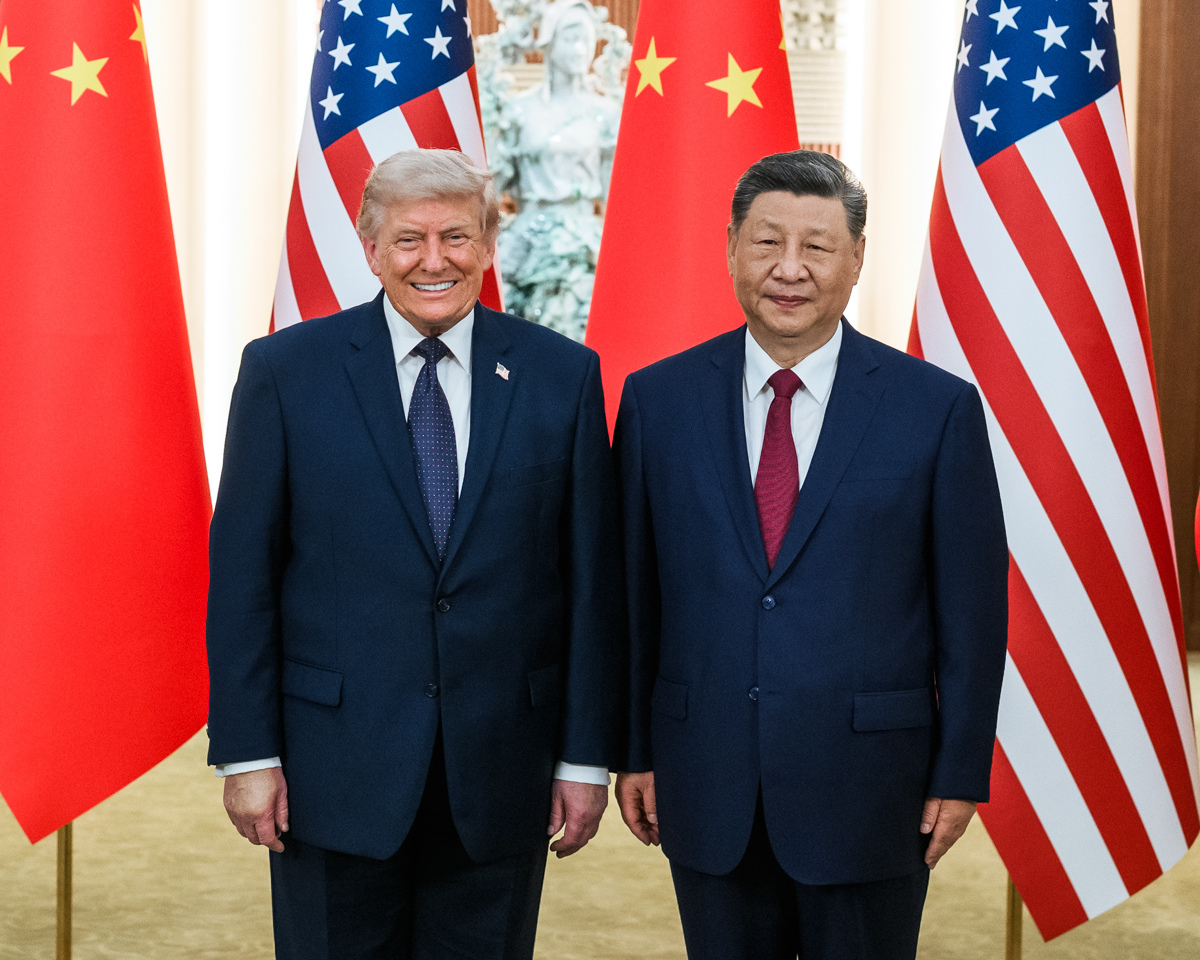
Trump with Chinese leader Xi Jinping at the Great Hall of the People during his state visit to China in May 2026

Trump with Chinese leader Xi Jinping at the White house during Xi's state visit to United States in September 2026

Just before Trump's second inauguration, Vice President Vance and ally Elon Musk each held separate meetings with China's vice president Han Zheng, who was in Washington attending the event as China's paramount leader Xi Jinping's special representative. Han's presence at the event was seen by commentators as representative of Xi's interest in strengthening relations between the two countries.

China has supported Trump's efforts to end the war in Ukraine.

During his 2024 presidential campaign, Trump advocated for a stringent stance against China, proposing tariffs as high as 60% on Chinese goods. Upon assuming office, he implemented a more modest 10% tariff on Chinese imports, while imposing tariffs on goods from traditional allies such as Canada and Mexico. Critics argue that this approach has inadvertently facilitated China's expanding influence in Europe and the Global South. By alienating key U.S. allies through aggressive trade policies, the administration has created opportunities for China to strengthen its economic and diplomatic ties in these regions, potentially at the expense of U.S. strategic interests. However, in April 2025, Trump increased the tariffs on Chinese goods to 145% which led China to respond by increasing its tariffs on American goods to 125%. Trump said the tariffs are intended to pressure China to do more to stop the flow of fentanyl into the US.

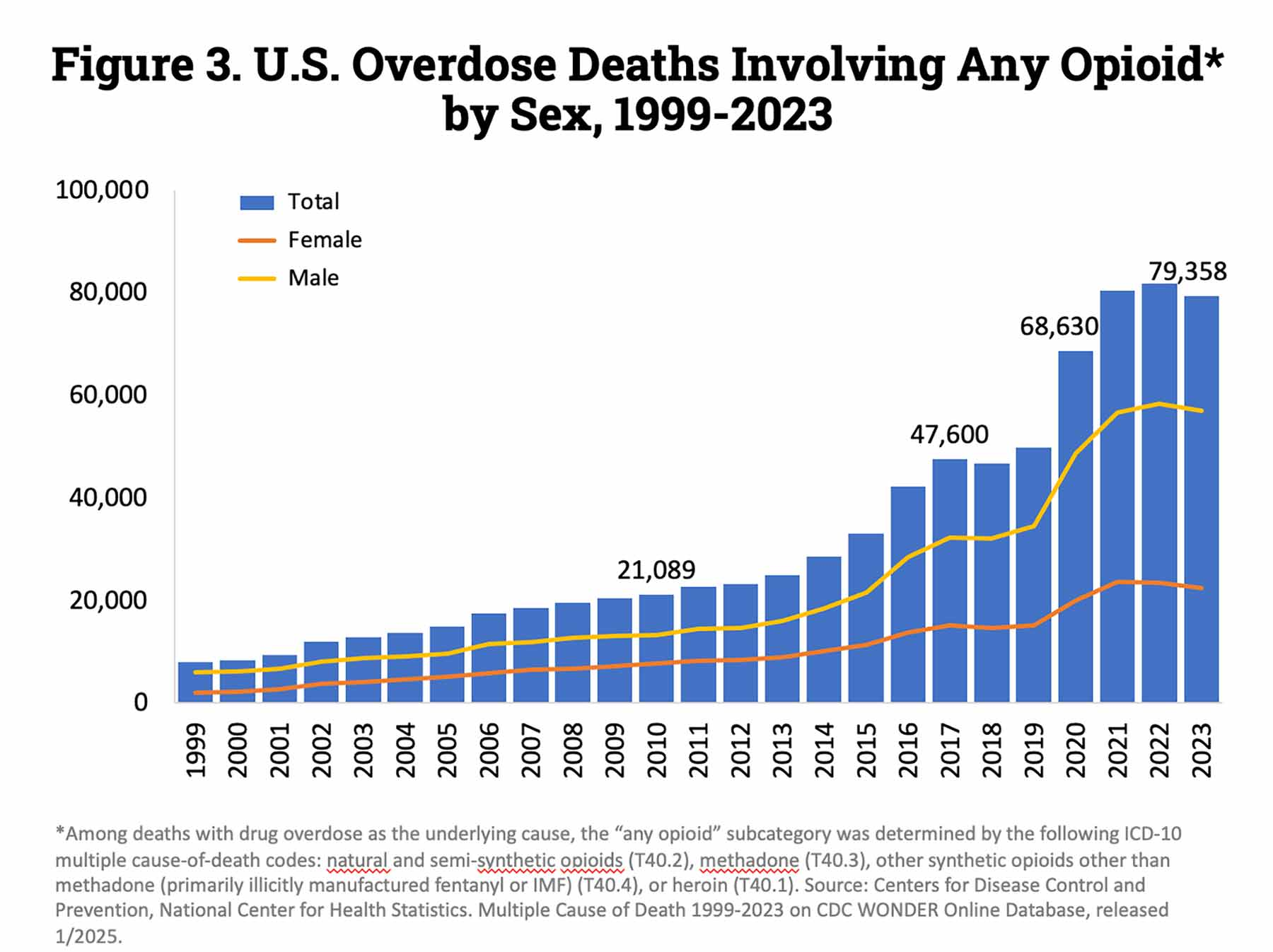
Trump has blamed China for the opioid crisis in the United States.

Under the directive published by the U.S. State Department in 2025, the Chinese leader (Xi Jinping) should be referred to as "General Secretary of the Chinese Communist Party" (highest position in China), rather than "President of China" reflecting the supremacy of the CCP over China.

In February 2025, the US State Department website was changed to state that China was trying to "subvert" international organizations and install Chinese Communist Party members in leadership positions. A spokesperson of the Foreign Ministry of China responded that these changes were inaccurate and that they "deplore" the changes.

On February 26, 2025, China accused Taiwan of using its semiconductor sector to gain political favor from the United States. Trump criticized Taiwan for its dominance in the U.S. semiconductor industry. Taiwan's government responded by emphasizing its commitment to preserving its position as a leader in semiconductor technology.

In March 2025, foreign ministers from Japan, China, and South Korea convened in Tokyo to enhance regional cooperation amid escalating global uncertainty. Trump's foreign policy, characterized by unilateralism and protectionist trade measures, has strained traditional alliances and prompted East Asian nations to seek closer collaboration among themselves. The meeting addressed shared challenges such as demographic decline, environmental concerns, and economic coordination. However, significant divisions persist, particularly regarding China's support for Russia and North Korea, and its broader regional assertiveness.

On April 2, 2025, Trump announced a "reciprocal tariff" of 32% on Taiwanese goods, but excluded semiconductor products, the island's primary exports. Trump had previously criticized Taiwan for gaining an unfair dominance in the semiconductor industry and not spending enough on its own defense.

In May 2025, Rubio announced the U.S. government would "aggressively revoke visas for Chinese students, including those with connections to the Chinese Communist Party (CCP) or studying in critical fields". He also announced the U.S. would increase scrutiny of all future visa applications from China and Hong Kong.

On June 5, 2025, Trump and Xi held a phone call which according to Trump "had focused entirely on the trade relationship between the nations."

In June 2025, the United States condemned the planned repression of Independence Day celebrations in Hong Kong.

In July 2025, Raja Krishnamoorthi, the top Democrat on the United States House Select Committee on Strategic Competition between the United States and the Chinese Communist Party, stated that the CCP could "so much as flick a switch and cause major damage" to the American economy. The committee expressed concerns about the United States' economic dependence on China, particularly in relation to critical mineral exports such as rare earths used in modern technology. The Trump administration denied Taiwan president Lai Ching-te permission to stop in New York during a planned visit to Central America after the PRC objected to the US stopover.

In October 2025, Trump claimed that China was secretly testing nuclear weapons and hinted that U.S. would follow suit by resuming tests of its own. However, Energy Secretary Chris Wright downplayed the idea.

Trump with Chinese leader Xi Jinping and Russian President Vladimir Putin ahead of their trilateral meeting at the 2026 APEC summit, November 19, 2026

A December 2025 post from Trump stated "I have informed President Xi, of China, that the United States will allow NVIDIA to ship its H200 products to approved customers in China, and other Countries".

In July 2026, Trump deployed the Navy-Marine Expeditionary Ship Interdiction System and Marine Air Defence Integrated System in the Luzon Strait and southern Japanese islands as part of the US military's regional war plan to defend Taiwan and deter a future Chinese invasion.

Trump was less aggressive towards China than in his first term.

Trump stated in a widely televised TV address though during July 2026 that China meddled in the 2020 election. Then again, Trump limited (stay) permit duration for Chinese press to 90 days.

==== Japan ====
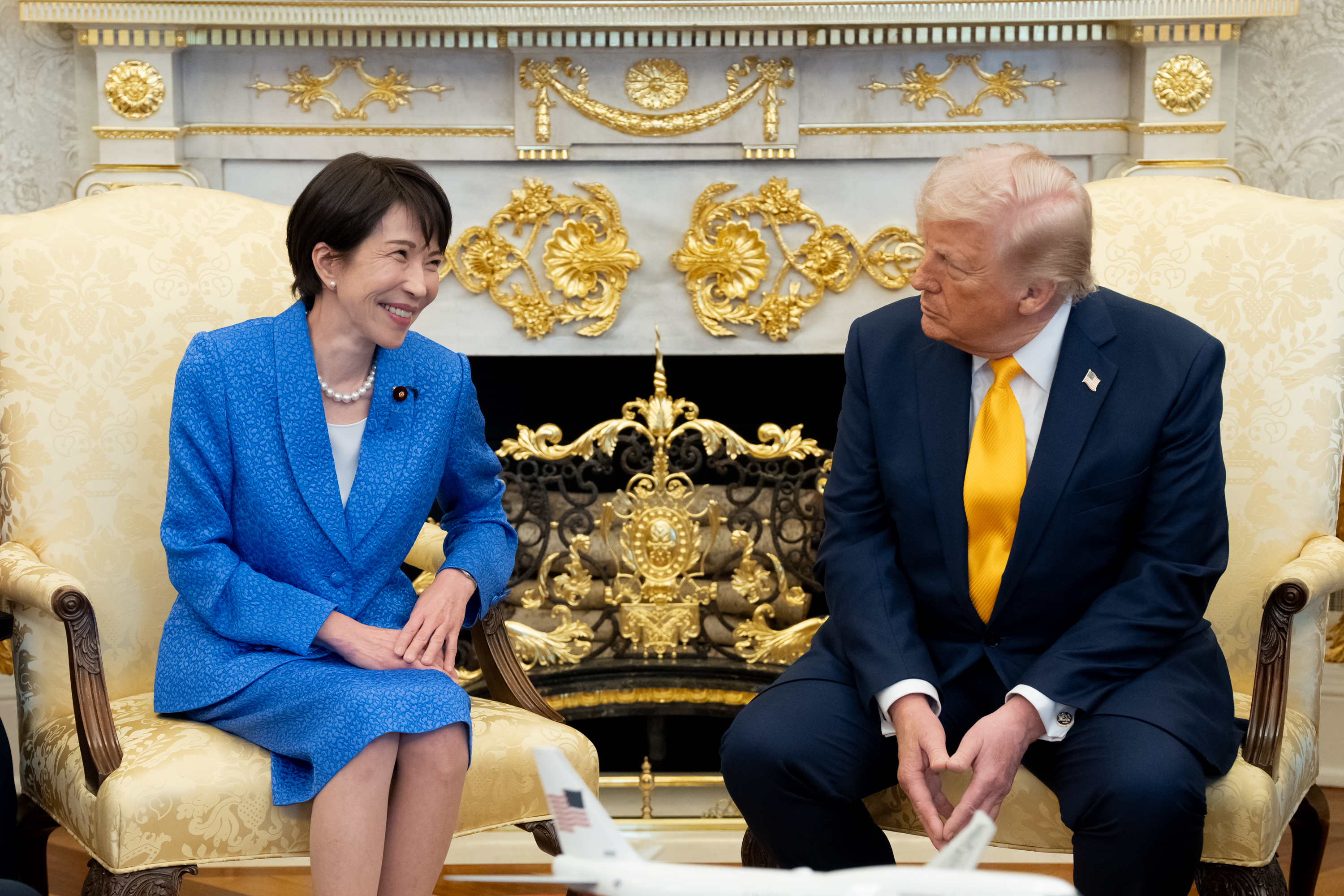
Trump and Japanese prime minister Sanae Takaichi, March 2026

The second Trump administration saw a deterioration of relations between Japan and the United States. Trump in March 2025 lamented that Japan is making "a fortune with [the United States] economically" while the U.S.–Japan Security Treaty requires the United States to "protect" Japan, but Japan does not have to "protect" the United States, so Trump "asked who makes these deals?" Also that month, Trump said that he "called the leaders of Japan to say you can't continue to reduce and break down your currency ... it's unfair ... And the way you solve it very easily is with tariffs."

Under Secretary of Defense for Policy Elbridge Colby pushed for Japan to increase its military spending to 3.5% of its GDP, which led Japan to cancel a meeting between Rubio and U.S. Defense Secretary Pete Hegseth and Japanese Defense Minister Gen Nakatani and Foreign Minister Takeshi Iwaya in Washington, D.C. Trump announced significant tariff rates against Japan, calling the country "spoiled". In response, Prime Minister Shigeru Ishiba stated that Japan needs "to make more efforts to become less dependent on the US".

==== North Korea ====
On February 20, 2025, North Korea criticized the U.S. over the AUKUS nuclear submarine deal, claiming it was a threat to their regional stability and peace. The KCNA claimed that the U.S. aimed for regional hegemony, and warned that the nuclear states won't sit by idly.

North Korea test-fired strategic cruise missiles on February 26, 2025, to demonstrate its nuclear counter-attack capabilities, following its vow to respond to U.S. actions it deemed hostile. These launches came after heightened military provocations from the U.S. and its allies, including joint exercises with South Korea. The missile tests marked the fourth of the year and were overseen by Kim Jong Un. North Korea emphasized its readiness for a nuclear counterattack, with Kim expressing satisfaction over the results. Despite Trump's outreach, North Korea remains preoccupied with supporting Russia in its war against Ukraine, and experts suggest diplomacy with the U.S. is unlikely unless the situation with Russia changes.

In July 2025, Kim Yo Jong signalled openness to re-engage via talks with Washington on the condition that that the DPRK is accepted as a nuclear-armed state, stating that denuclearisation talks would be deemed a "mockery." This was in response to White House Press Secretary Karoline Leavitt a month prior expressing Trump's desire to build on "progress" made at the 2018 Singapore summit.

On September 5, 2025, The New York Times reported that an unsuccessful covert action to place listening devices in North Korean territory had resulted in the deaths of two or three North Korean civilians.

==== South Korea ====
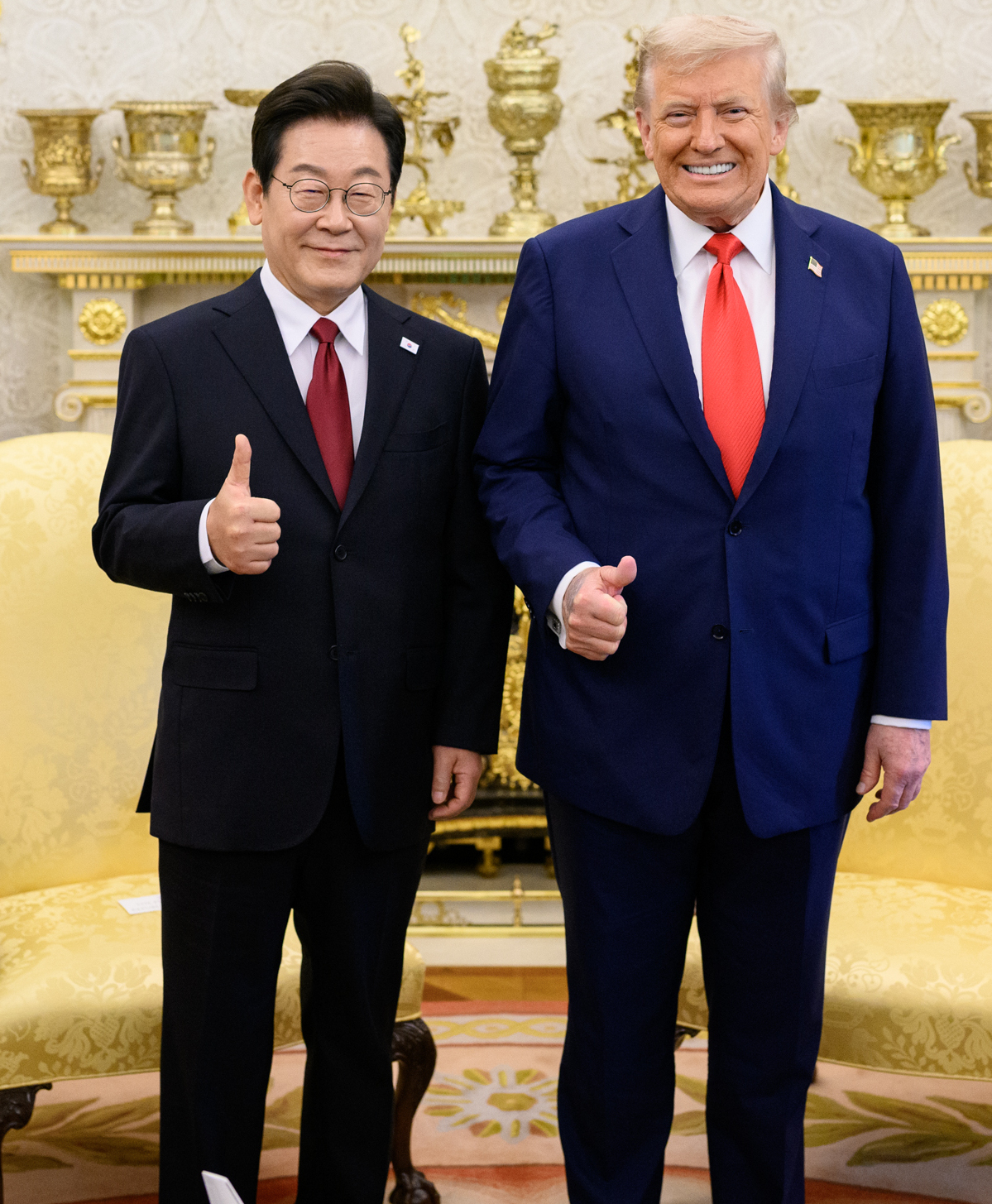
Trump and South Korean president Lee Jae Myung, August 2025

As part of President Donald Trump's Liberation Day tariffs in April 2025, the United States announced a trade deal with South Korea that called for tariffs of up to 25% on their goods. Rather than retaliating with tariffs of their own, South Korea pursued a proactive negotiation strategy, sending officials frequently to Washington to create a framework for a deal that would reduce the US tariff rate. As a result, the US lowered their tariffs on South Korea to 15%, while South Korea pledged a $350bn investment fund for US-owned companies within their country.

Following the September 2025 Georgia Hyundai plant immigration raid where 300 Korean workers were detained, President Lee Jae Myung warned that concerns over the treatment of Korean technicians in the United States were making businesses hesitant to invest directly, further complicating the trade negotiations. "We will not make a decision that goes against our national interests," he said, adding, "We will not engage in negotiations that are not rational or just."

Trump ordered the Pentagon to reduce yearly joint exercises with South Korea, saying that the ally refused to help with the 2026 Iran war and citing his good relationship with North Korean leader Kim Jong Un.

=== South and Central Asia ===
==== Afghanistan ====
In September and October 2025, Trump publicly expressed interest in regaining access to Bagram Airfield in Afghanistan, citing strategic concerns, including its proximity to China's nuclear and missile facilities. Afghan and Chinese officials have rejected the idea of a renewed American military presence. In response, Zabihullah Mujahid stated that "Afghans will never allow their land to be handed over to anyone under any circumstances." Members of the Moscow Format of Consultations on Afghanistan, including regional states like India, Iran, China and the Central Asian countries, rejected the idea in a joint statement against "attempts by countries to deploy their military infrastructure in Afghanistan."

==== India and Pakistan ====
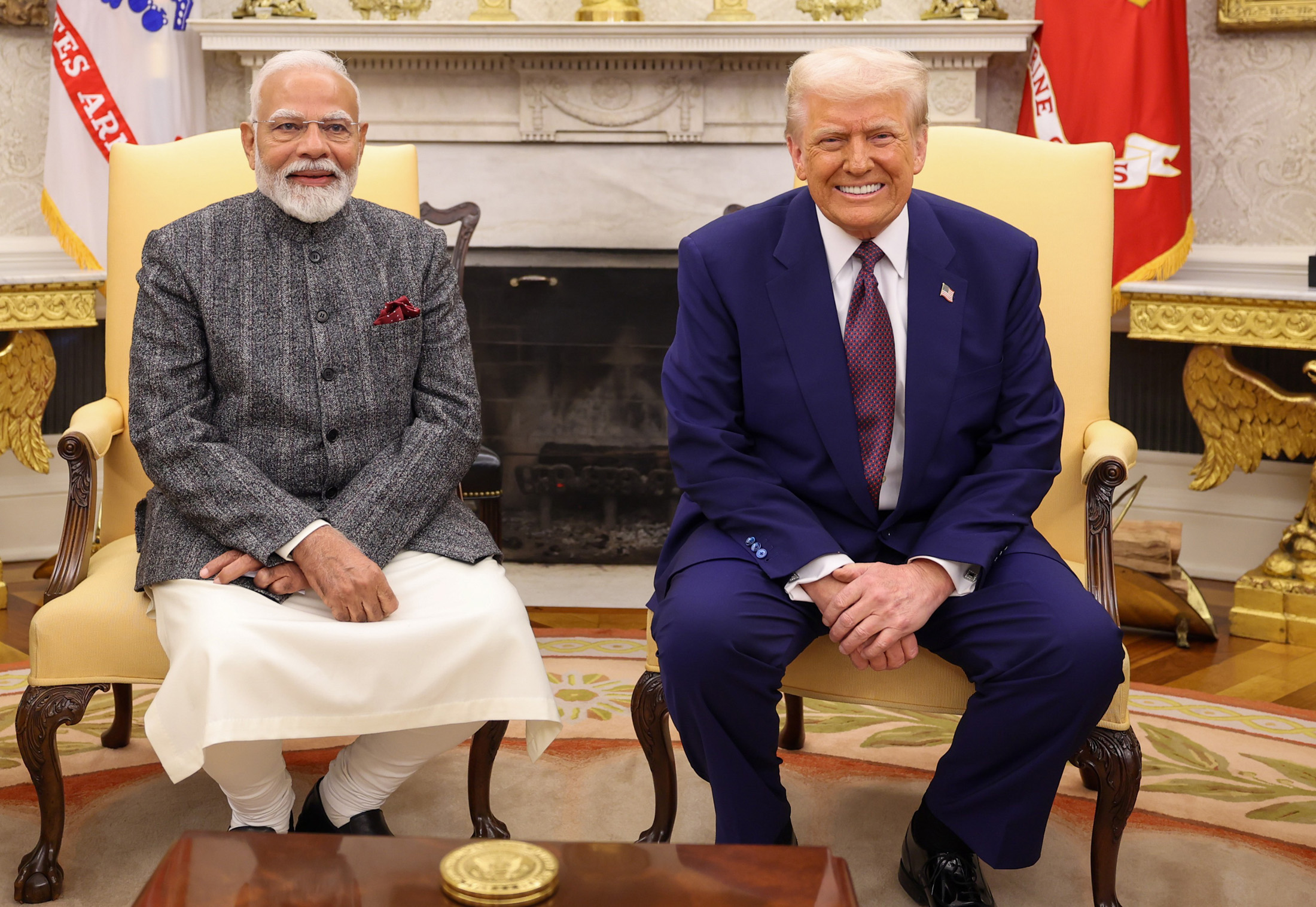
Trump and Indian prime minister Narendra Modi, February 2025

Trump and Indian prime minister Narendra Modi have pledged to deepen the U.S.-India partnership. On February 13, 2025, Modi became the fourth world leader to visit Trump at the White House. During the meeting, Modi praised the MAGA movement and said that "Borrowing an expression from the US, our vision for a developed India is to 'Make India Great Again', or MIGA. When America and India work together, when it's MAGA plus MIGA, it becomes mega – a mega partnership for prosperity."

India rejected Trump's offer to mediate India–China tensions. Modi also rejected Trump's offer to mediate in Operation Sindoor. Additionally, India's defense minister also rejected the claims made by Trump that it was he who "ended the conflict".

In July 2025, Trump criticized India over its continued oil trade with Russia, despite ongoing Western sanctions. Trump announced that a 25% reciprocal tariff on Indian goods would go into effect on August 1 and warned of an additional, unspecified penalty in response to India's continued purchases of Russian military equipment and energy. These remarks and policy announcements were seen as a reaction to India's ongoing oil imports from Russia, which Trump suggested were indirectly funding the war in Ukraine. In September, Modi reacted to Trump's 50% tariff on Indian imports by warming relations with China.

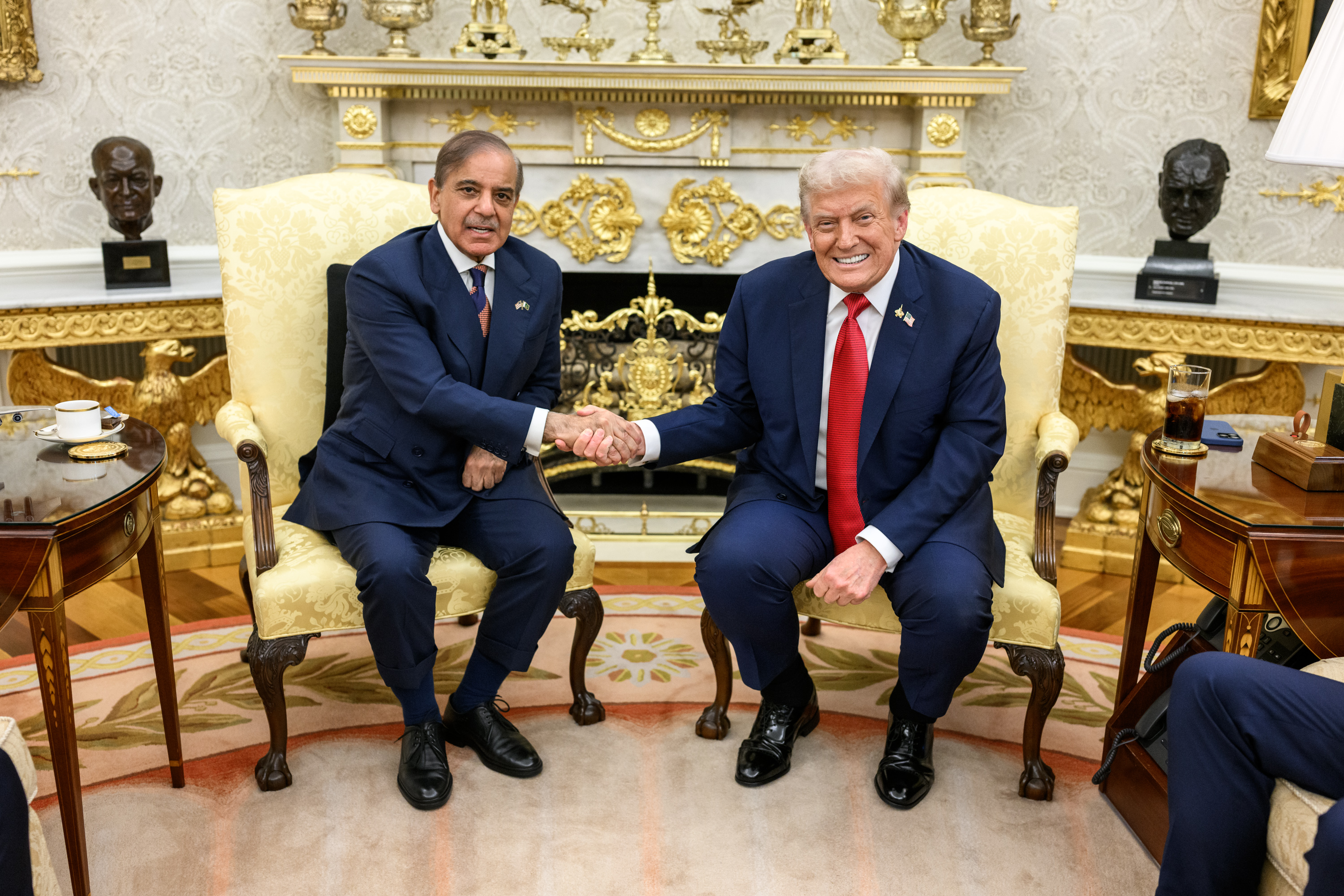
Trump and Pakistani prime minister Shehbaz Sharif, September 2025

In March 2025, Trump thanked Pakistan for its aid in capturing a regional Islamic State leader linked to an attack in 2021 at the airport in Kabul, Afghanistan, that killed 13 American servicemembers.

In May 2025, Trump claimed to have ended the conflict between India and Pakistan through a mediated ceasefire, a claim that India denies, but Pakistan corroborates. After the conflict, Pakistan nominated Trump for the Nobel Peace Prize "in recognition of his decisive diplomatic intervention and pivotal leadership" in resolving the India–Pakistan crisis. In June 2025, Trump met Pakistani Chief of Army Staff Asim Munir in a private meeting at the White House, the first time a Pakistani military chief who was not a head of state was hosted by a US president. Trump thanked Munir for his prevention of war with India and described him as "smart".

In July 2025, the Trump administration reached a trade agreement with Pakistan, in which Trump announced that the United States would help Pakistan develop its large and untapped oil reserves. The agreement also reduced American reciprocal tariffs on Pakistan to 19%, the lowest of any country in South Asia. Despite the political claims, no major oil reserves have been discovered in Pakistan, and experts remain skeptical about their existence. Moin Raza Khan, former managing director of Pakistan Petroleum Limited, stated that "what Trump is claiming about Pakistan's massive oil reserves has nothing to do with reality," citing a lack of supporting data or surveys. GA Sabri, former federal secretary at the Ministry of Petroleum, called the claims a "political gimmick" and warned of high security risks in potential drilling regions. Nevertheless, U.S. chargé d'affaires Natalie Baker confirmed American interest in Pakistan's energy sector, and a $500 million US investment deal in Pakistan's mineral industry was announced, despite the absence of verified data on substantial reserves.

In September 2025, Trump met with Pakistani prime minister Shehbaz Sharif at a multilateral meeting with Muslim leaders on the sidelines of the eightieth session of the United Nations General Assembly to discuss an end to the Gaza war. He met Shehbaz again the same month during a meeting at the White House, in which Shehbaz called for further American investment in Pakistan and greater security cooperation.

In October 2025, Secretary of State Marco Rubio remarked that US's ties to Pakistan would not come at the cost of its "friendship" with India which he described as "deep, historic, and important."

=== Southeast Asia ===
==== Cambodia and Thailand ====
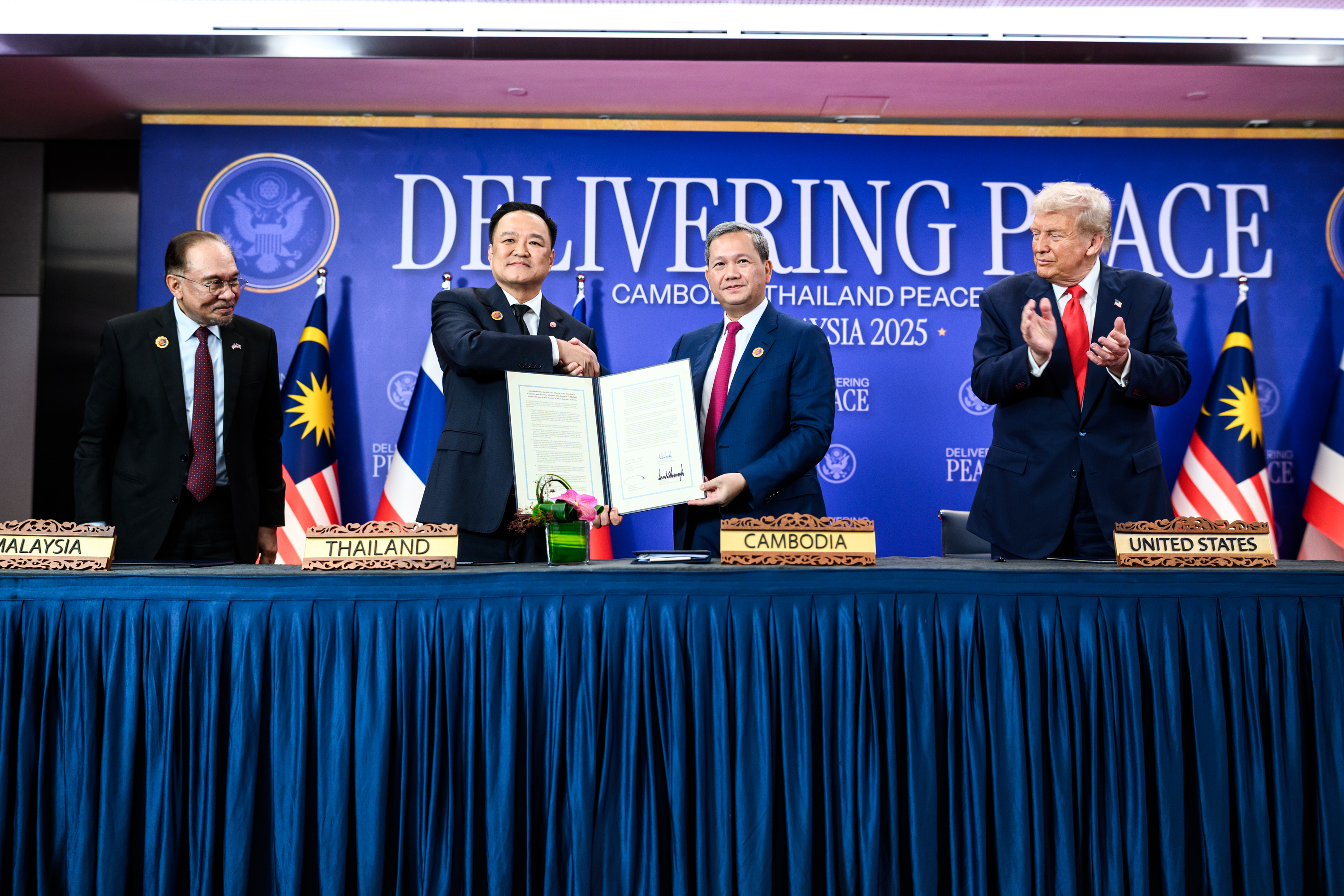
Trump signs the peace accord, alongside Cambodian prime minister Hun Manet, Thai prime minister Anutin Charnvirakul, and Malaysian prime minister Anwar Ibrahim in Kuala Lumper, October 26, 2025

Trump claimed to not be interested in a trade deal with Cambodia or Thailand if conflict continued. On October 26, 2025, Trump witnessed the signing of the Kuala Lumpur Peace Accord between representatives of the Cambodian and Thai governments. During the 47th East Asia Summit held in Kuala Lumpur that same day, Trump signed multiple trade agreements with Cambodia and Thailand.

==== Indonesia ====
In April 2025, the Trump administration threatened Indonesia with 32% tariffs on all Indonesian goods, effective on August 1. However, on July 22, 2025, President Trump announced that the United States and Indonesia had agreed to terms on the framework of a trade agreement. Indonesian goods exported to the United States would be reduced to a 19% tariff. According to Trump, Indonesia agreed to decrease their tariffs on US goods and to purchase US energy worth US$1.5 billion, US agricultural products worth US$4.5 billion, and 50 Boeing aircraft.

==== Malaysia ====
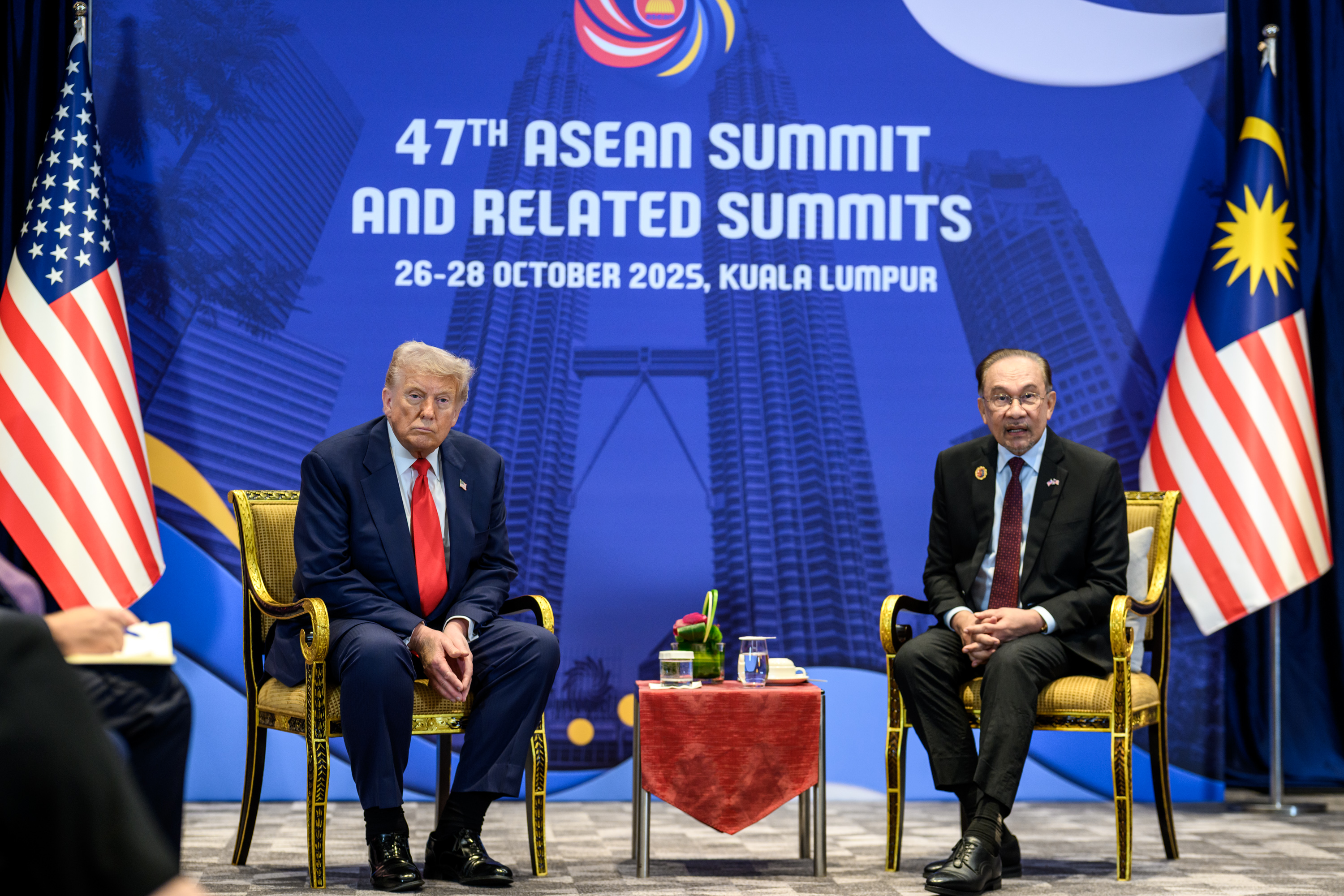
Trump and Malaysian president Anwar Ibrahim in Kuala Lumpur, October 2025

Between October 26 and 27, 2025, Trump visited Kuala Lumpur where he attended the 47th ASEAN Summit. Trump also met with Malaysian prime minister Anwar Ibrahim and signed multiple trade agreements including one exempting 1,711 Malaysian products from US tariffs and a rare earths mineral development and export agreement.

==== Philippines ====
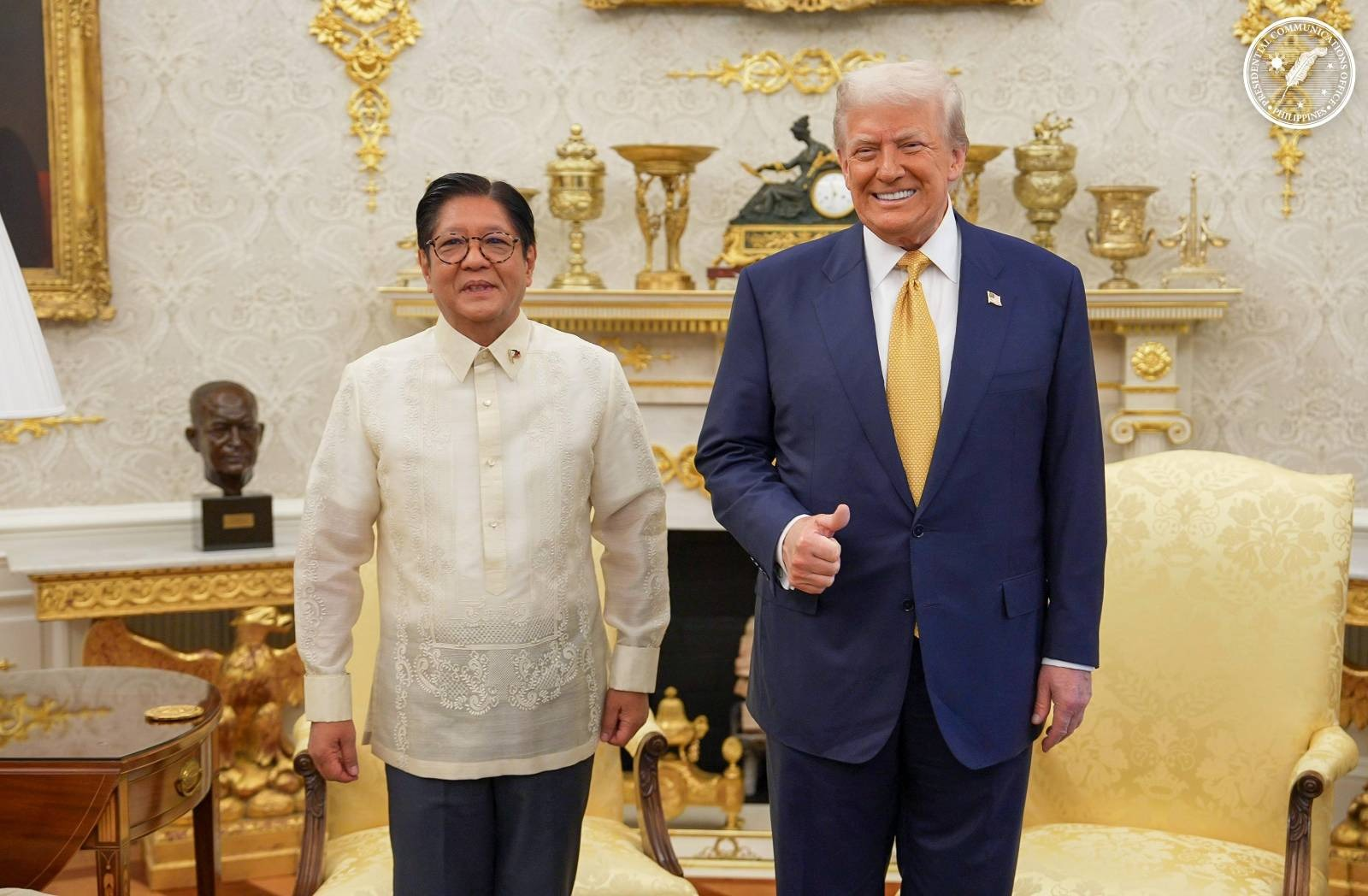
Trump and Philippine president Bongbong Marcos, July 2025

The Trump administration has moved to bolster the United States' alliance with the Philippines, framing it as vital to a "free, open, prosperous, and secure Indo-Pacific" amid rising Chinese assertiveness in the South China Sea. In February 2025, the administration exempted the Philippines from an broader freeze on foreign aid, releasing about $336 million to modernize the Philippine armed forces and coast guard. During a meeting with Philippine president Bongbong Marcos on July 21, 2025, Defense Secretary Hegseth reaffirmed that the countries' 1951 Mutual Defense Treaty "extends to armed attacks" on Philippine forces "anywhere in the Pacific, including the South China Sea". Hegseth highlighted deepening military cooperation – including new U.S. missile deployments and expanded joint military exercises in the Philippines – aimed at forging a "strong shield of real deterrence for peace" in the region. On July 22, 2025, following a meeting with Marcos at the White House, Trump announced U.S. plans to establish a joint ammunition manufacturing hub at Subic Bay, a former American naval base in the Philippines. Trump said the project would ensure that allies would have "more ammunition than any country has ever had", including various missile systems. The One Big Beautiful Bill Act, signed into law earlier that month, directs the Departments of Defense and State to study the facility's feasibility, citing the absence of a forward-staged production site in the Indo-Pacific.

The administration has opposed international inquiries into the Philippine government's conduct. After the International Criminal Court (ICC) opened a case against former Philippine president Rodrigo Duterte over killings in his anti-drug campaign, the State Department imposed sanctions on four ICC judges (including one handling Duterte's case), and Rubio denounced the court's actions as "illegitimate and baseless" attempts to target the U.S. or its allies.

==== Singapore ====
In April 2025, Trump administration announced 10% universal tariff on all goods brought into the U.S. with 60 countries facing even higher rates. This effectively imposed a 10% tariff on Singapore as well.

In May 2025, Singapore's Ministry of Foreign Affairs said foreign embassies should not use international disputes involving third parties to provoke domestic reactions as such geopolitical matters were best handled through diplomacy. The statement was made following an argument on social media between the US and Chinese embassies over the South China Sea that stemmed from a video posted by the US Embassy which likened China's maritime claims to a neighbor illegally occupying shared spaces in Singapore's public housing.

== Europe ==
=== European Union ===
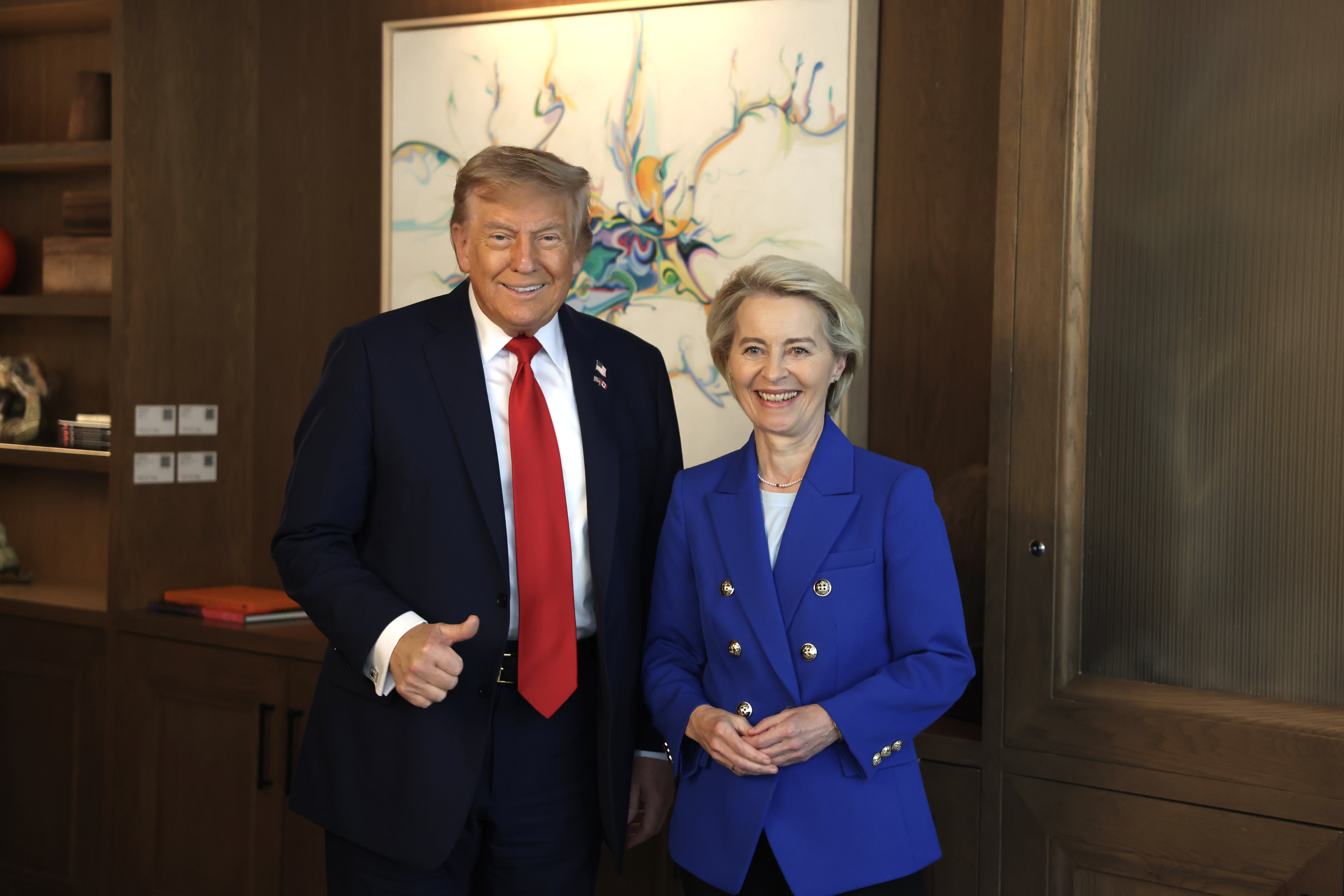
President Trump with Ursula von der Leyen at the 51st G7 summit in Canada, June 16, 2025

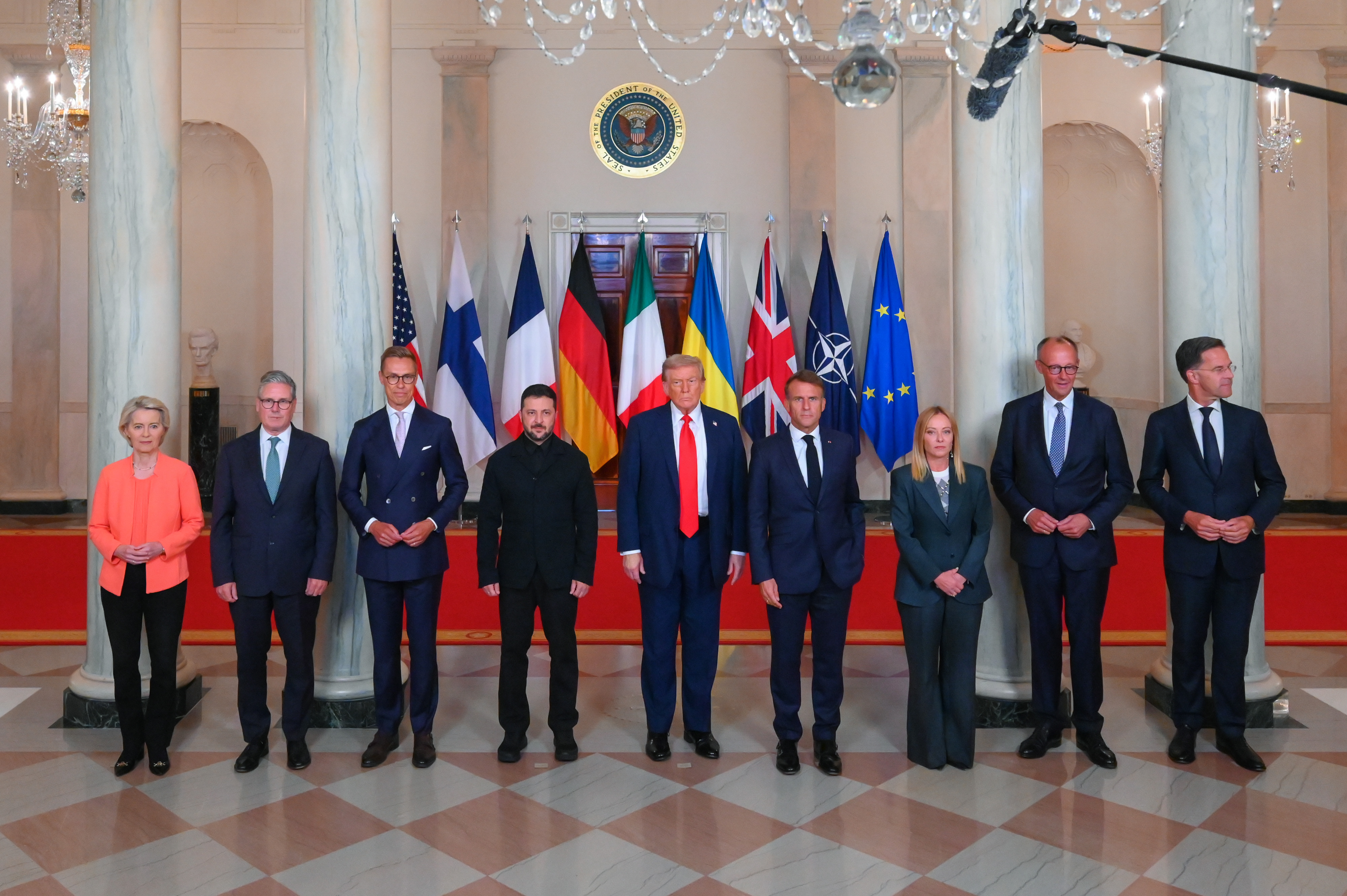
President Trump with Ukrainian president Volodymyr Zelenskyy and European leaders on August 18, 2025

During his election campaign, Trump said that European allies "treat us actually worse than our so-called enemies". He added, "We protect them and then they screw us on trade. We're not going to let it happen anymore". He vowed to impose tariffs on trade partners including those in Europe, which economists said could spark trade wars.

Trump said he would not defend NATO allies in Europe if they did not meet the alliance's target of spending 2% of GDP on defense, and instead he would "encourage" Russia to "do whatever the hell they want".

On February 14, 2025, U.S. vice president JD Vance addressed the Munich Security Conference, asserting that Europe's primary threats are internal, citing perceived erosions in free speech and democratic values. He criticized European leaders for suppressing dissenting opinions and ignoring public concerns on issues like immigration. Vance highlighted incidents such as the annulment of Romania's presidential election due to alleged foreign interference and legal actions against individuals in the UK and Sweden for expressing conservative views as evidence of this trend. He also challenged Germany's political isolation of the far-right Alternative for Germany (AfD) party, advocating for greater political inclusivity. European officials, including German Defence Minister Boris Pistorius, rebuffed Vance's remarks, deeming them unacceptable and misaligned with the conference's focus on external security threats like Russia and China. The speech intensified transatlantic tensions, prompting discussions among European leaders about reducing reliance on U.S. support.

During the 2020s, there was a significant shift in European defense policy, particularly accelerating in 2025 due to geopolitical policy shifts during Trump's second presidency. NATO secretary general Mark Rutte announced during the 61st Munich Security Conference that alliance members would need to increase their military spending to "considerably more than 3 percent" of their national GDP. This statement came in response to calls from the Trump administration for members to reach 5% of GDP in defense expenditure. On March 2, British prime minister Keir Starmer hosted the 2025 London Summit on Ukraine with 18 world leaders, in order to coordinate support for Ukraine during the Russian invasion of Ukraine. The summit followed a meeting between Zelenskyy and Trump at the White House in Washington on February 28, 2025. On March 4, European Commission president Ursula von der Leyen proposed ReArm Europe, a five-point plan to boost defense spending by up to €800 billion, including €150 billion in loans to EU member states. This came a day after Trump halted all military aid to Ukraine.

Surprisingly, Trump attacked the EU at the end of 2025 without having any external input, but bluntly stated the European civilization will be at an end soon ("civilization erasure"). Furthermore, a Trump memo dubbed it "cultivating resistance to Europe's current trajectory within European nations" concerning support of far-right parties by the U.S. within Europe. The unexpected outcome of the Trump memo was then that Europe shared mostly its displeasure with the memo but Russia actually hailed it, what never happened before. Euca head Antonio Costa was then pretty eager to denounce Trunp's memo as a cause for concern as if there was need for protection against (Europe's) own allies. Furthermore, Trump gave an interview to Politico where he declared his dismay with certain European leaders: "You get some real stupid ones, too." The pope contributed to the general public refusal of Trump's position by saying that Trump should not to 'break apart' (the) US-Europe relationship . There seems to be also the idea that the EU can be weakened from within as there is an extended unpublished version (of the NSS). Trump came to grips with his standpoint of advancing his idea to have certain voices heard (NSS, see before) and issued travel bans against EU officials supporting net regulations and internet hate speech opposers among them Thierry Breton. In April 2026, Trump publicly criticized pope Leo in regard to his soft stance on the Iran war. Italy's prime minister Meloni then rebuked the criticism as baseless.

On 10 April 2026, Spain released a statement about the Strait of Hormuz saying that the US does not have hegemony over the waterway. In effect, Hegseth decried the position as (inept) and demanded allied support from the partners without reluctance. There also surfaced emails which demanded that Spain shall be booted from NATO. Prime Sanchez took a stand then claiming that Spain is a reliable NATO partner.

Marco Rubio held a meeting with the pope on 7th of may 26 discussing several issues that rose over the past concerning “the situation in the Middle East and topics of mutual interest in the Western Hemisphere.”

Hegseth then continued on his path as he was about to cut NATO-available US commitments. In a paradox move though, or maybe meant as means of reassurance for the Allies, the US announced that it will expand its nuclear stockpile in Europe.

Ahead of a NATO summit, Hegseth declared that European NATO allies need to take the lead in building an improving NATO, making clear before a 6-month review of American forces in Europe that he intends to eventually decrease deployment in Europe if nothing happens.

Discussions of Canada becoming an associate member of the EU were not welcomed by the Trump administration.

In October 2026 the G7 countries agreed a deal under which the EU would grant access to its diesel and the US would drop its threat of an export ban on diesel to the EU.

=== Eastern Europe ===
==== Belarus ====
Under Trump, US policy toward Belarus changed from isolation to engagement with Alexander Lukashenko's government. After Keith Kellogg's talks with Lukashenko in Minsk on June 21, 2025, Lukashenko released 14 political prisoners, including Sergei Tikhanovsky.

Before his Alaska meeting with Putin, Trump called Lukashenko and called him "the highly respected President". In response, Lukashenko invited Trump and his family to visit Minsk; Belarusian state media reported that the invitation was accepted. It was the first phone call between Lukashenko and an American president during Lukashenko's 31 year in power.

On September 11, 2025, after a direct appeal from Trump, Belarus released 52 detainees, including 14 foreign nationals, in a step widely interpreted as part of a tentative rapprochement; in exchange, Washington eased certain sanctions on state airline Belavia, and Trump's envoy John Coale discussed reopening the US Embassy in Minsk while delivering a personal letter from Trump to Lukashenko. European officials and analysts noted the move as one of the largest single prisoner releases of Lukashenko's rule but remained wary of Minsk's motives and the absence of deeper reforms. Lukashenko deported the released political prisoners; many of them were taken directly to Lithuania without passports; opposition figures labeled the transfers "forced deportations", arguing that political prisoners should have the right to remain in Belarus. Opposition leader Mikola Statkevich refused to cross into Lithuania and then disappeared, with allies fearing he was rearrested. While some freed prisoners publicly thanked Trump for securing their release, others said they were near the end of their sentences and wanted to go home. Critics also emphasized that the gesture fell well short of the roughly 1,200–1,400 political prisoners still held in Belarusian prisons.

On December 13, 2025, Lukashenko released 123 political prisoners including opposition leaders Maria Kalesnikava, Maxim Znak, Viktar Babaryka, Nobel laureate Ales Bialiatski, and journalists Pavel Sevyarynets and Marina Zolotova in exchange for the lifting of sanctions on the Belarusian potash industry by the United States. They were exiled to Ukraine and Lithuania.

==== Hungary ====
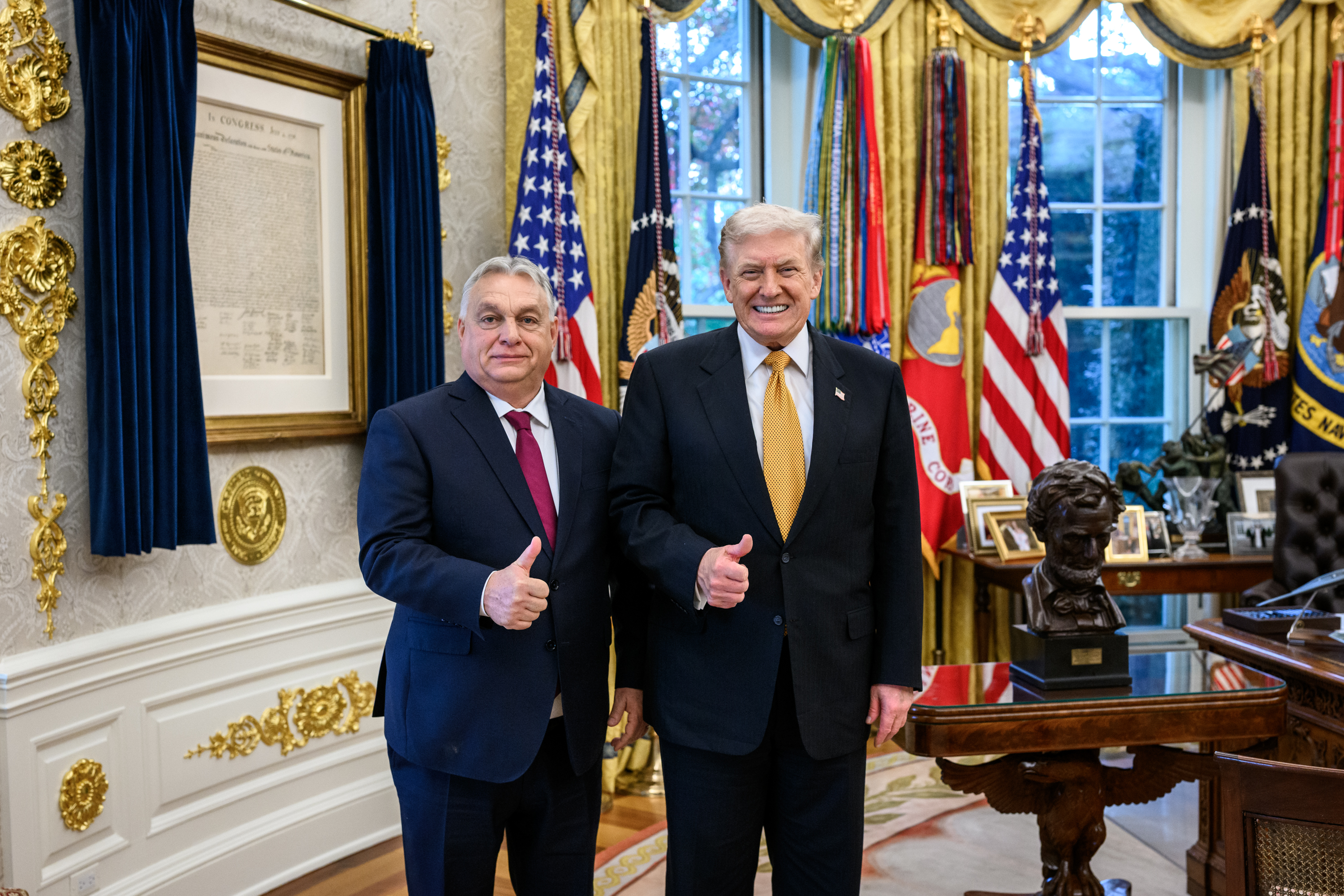
Trump and Hungarian prime minister Viktor Orbán, November 2025

==== Poland ====
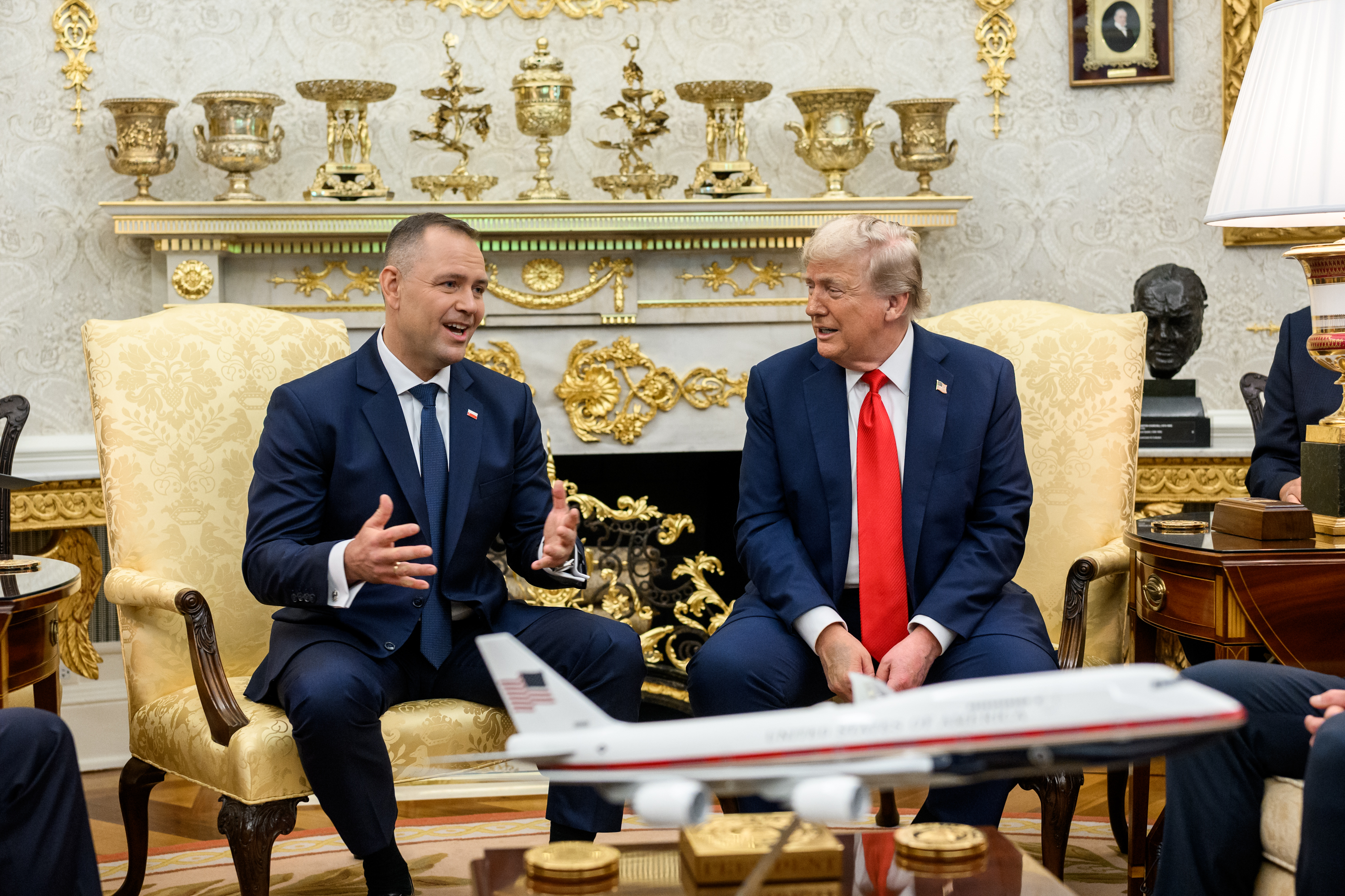
Trump and Polish president Karol Nawrocki, September 2025

On February 22, 2025, Polish president Andrzej Duda met with President Trump as the first European head of state during Trump's 2nd term. On February 28 during briefing in the Oval Office Trump stated: "I am very committed to Poland. I think Poland has really risen to the occasion and done a great job for NATO. As you know, they paid more than they had to. They are one of the best groups of people I have ever met". During a meeting with U.S. president Donald Trump in September 2025, Polish president Karol Nawrocki received assurances that the United States would not consider withdrawing its troops from Poland and that Washington would support Warsaw "all the way." Trump also suggested sending more US troops to Poland, if the country "wants to". After major incursion of Russian drones into Polish airspace in September 2025, Polish officials dismissed President Trump's suggestion that it could have been a mistake by Vladimir Putin's military.

On 21 May 2026, President Donald Trump announced via social media that the United States would deploy 5,000 troops to Poland, reversing a Pentagon decision made the previous week to cancel troop deployments there.

==== Romania ====
The administration was reported to have been involved in the legal affairs of the Tate brothers.

==== Russia and Ukraine ====
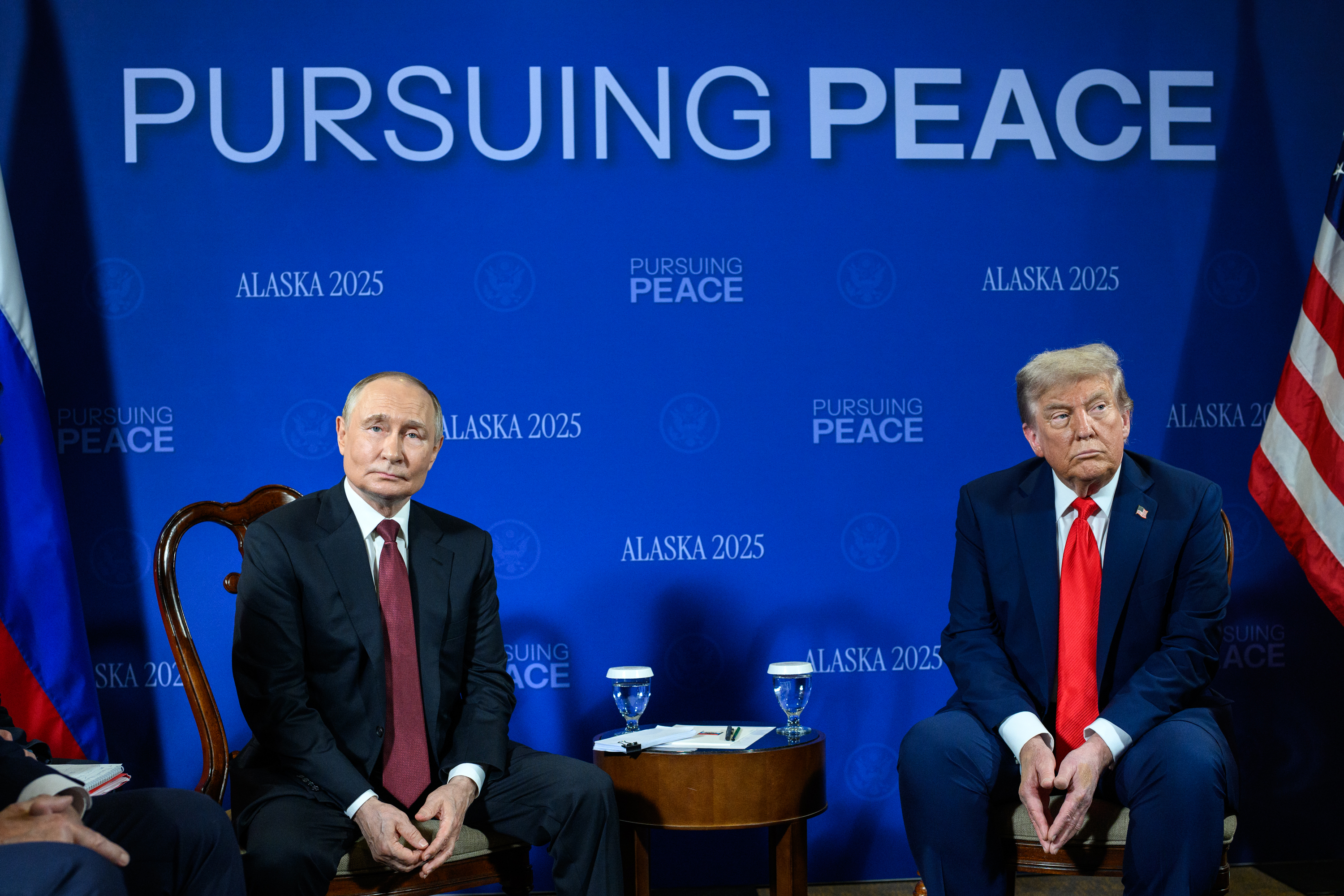
Trump and Russian president Vladimir Putin at the summit meeting in Alaska, August 2025

In March 2026, during the 2026 Strait of Hormuz crisis, the adminsistration lifted sanctions on Russian oil.

===== Prologue =====
In January 2025, the Russo-Ukrainian War remains a protracted and attritional conflict, with frontlines largely static despite ongoing offensives. Russia maintains operational momentum, making incremental gains in the Donbas and southern Ukraine, but faces heavy losses in manpower and equipment. Ukraine, while resilient, faces growing logistical challenges, relying on dwindling Western military aid and precision strikes to counter Russian assaults. The war has evolved into high-intensity trench warfare, marked by drone technology, artillery duels, and attritional urban combat.

There is a growing number of desertions in both the Ukrainian and Russian armed forces. Ukraine's economy continues to function, sustained by foreign financial aid, while Russia's wartime economy remains stable despite international sanctions. Morale remains high among Ukrainian forces, though exhaustion is evident, while reports suggest growing Russian discontent among mobilized troops. The global impact of the war intensifies, with European nations increasing defense spending and China, Iran, and North Korea providing indirect support to Russia. With NATO stockpiles under strain and U.S. policy uncertain under the new Trump administration, the war's trajectory remains unclear. The Biden administration's policy of sustained military aid has ended, raising concerns over potential negotiations that could favor Moscow and shift the balance of power in Europe.

===== Initial actions =====
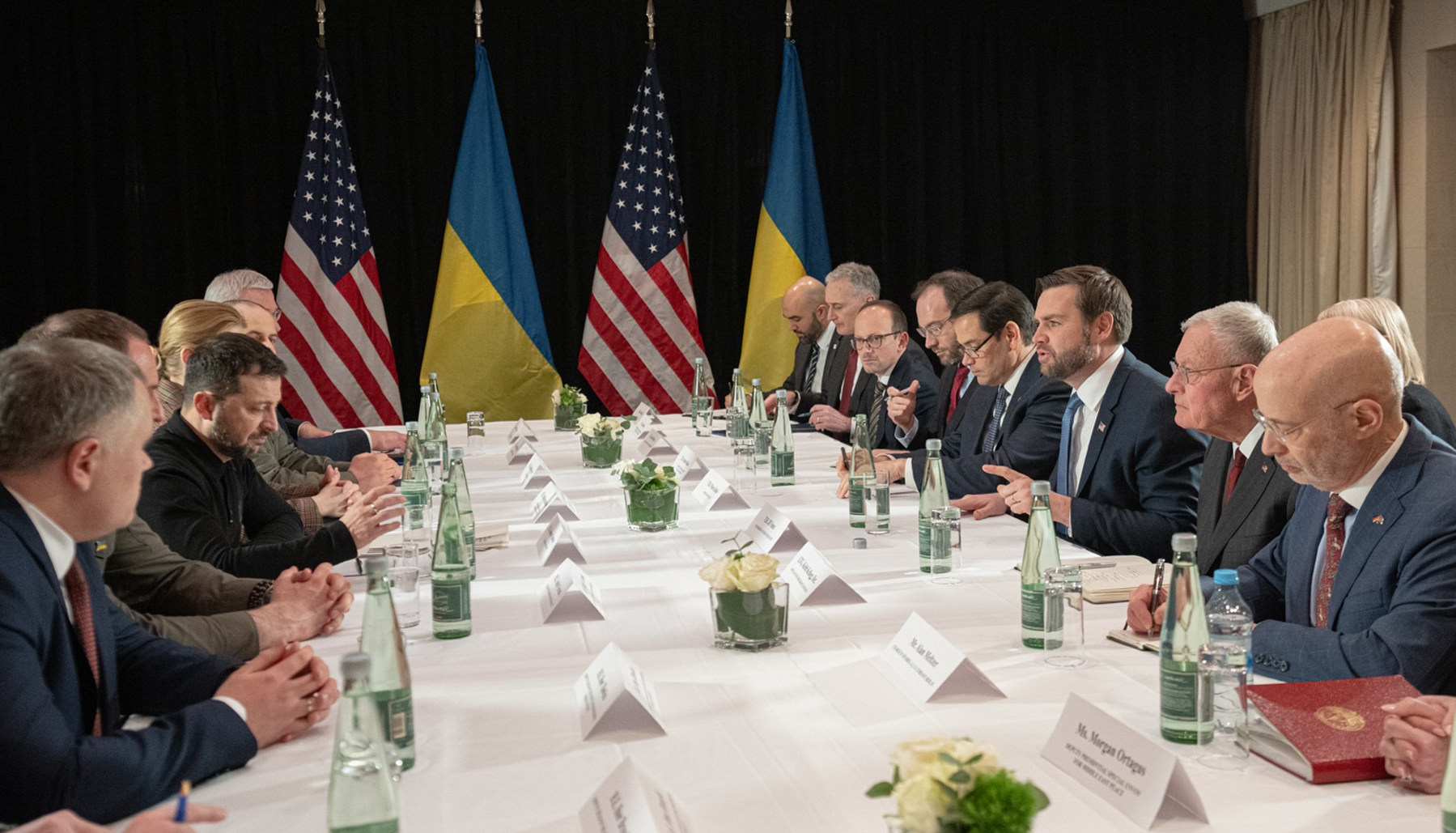
Ukrainian and US delegations meet at the 2025 Munich Security Conference.

On the Russo-Ukrainian War, Trump vowed that even before he was inaugurated, he would negotiate an end to the war in a day. He also vowed to stop the "endless flow of American treasure to Ukraine", and make Europeans reimburse the U.S. the cost of rebuilding its old stockpiles. However, critics have pointed out that most of the money set aside for Ukraine actually goes to American companies, factories and workers who make weapons and military equipment.

Retired lieutenant general Keith Kellogg and Frederick H. Fleitz, who both served in Trump's National Security Council staff, had presented Trump with a detailed peace plan to end Russia's war in Ukraine. The plan aims to force the two sides into peace talks and a ceasefire based on the current frontlines. If Ukraine refused to enter peace talks, weapons supplies would be stopped; if Russia refused peace talks, weapons supplies to Ukraine would be increased.

Following his victory, Trump warned that he would impose high tariffs and further sanctions on Russia if Vladimir Putin did not make a "deal" to end the war against Ukraine. Trump said he was "not looking to hurt Russia" and had "always had a very good relationship with President Putin," for whom he has expressed admiration.

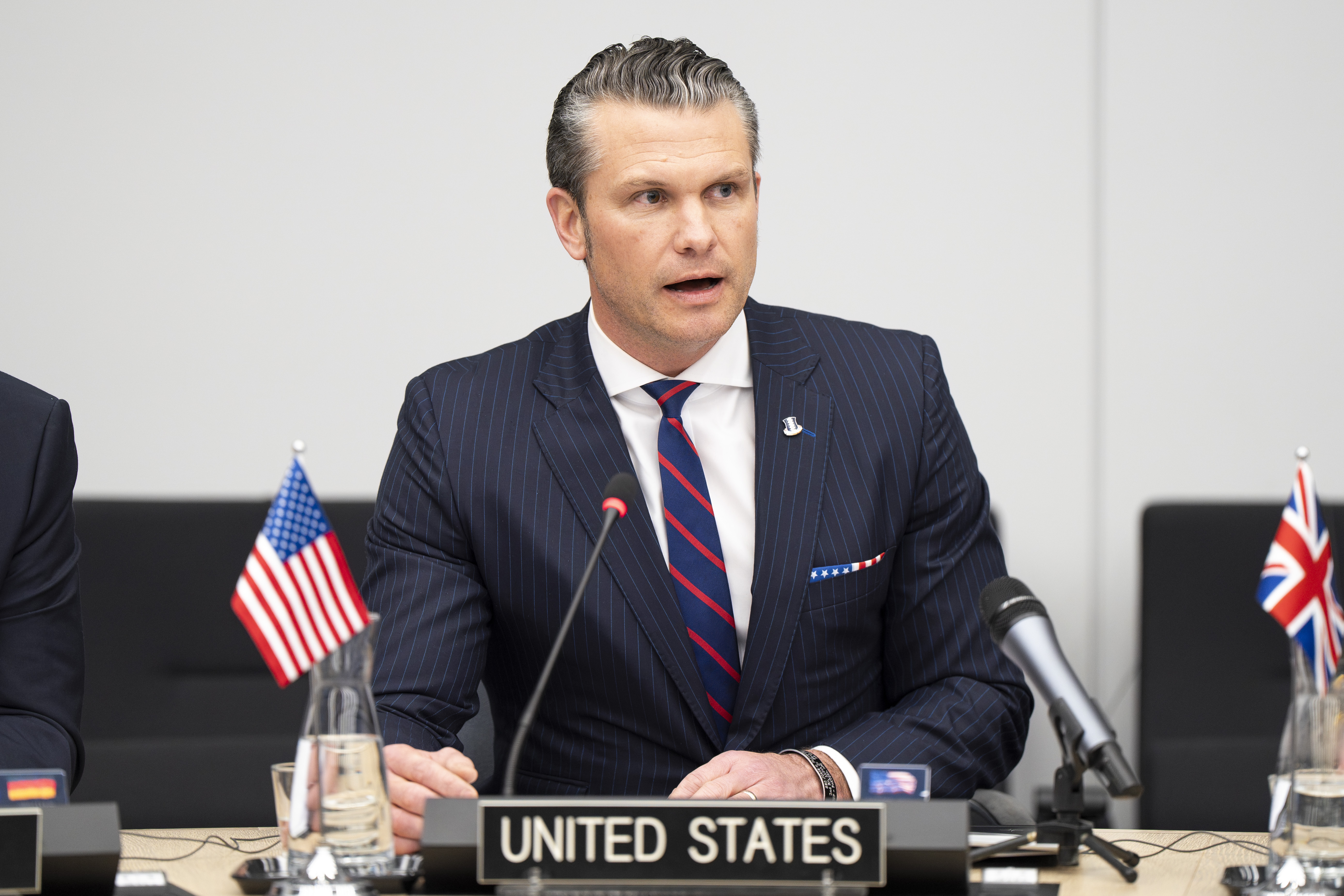
Pete Hegseth at the meeting of the Ukraine Defense Contact Group at NATO headquarters, February 12, 2025

Trump's presidency marked a reversal of Biden's policy towards Ukraine and the Russian invasion. On February 12, 2025, at the first meeting of the Ukraine Defense Contact Group after Trump was inaugurated, new US Secretary of Defense Pete Hegseth said a return to Ukraine's pre-2014 borders was "an unrealistic objective" and that attempting to regain all territory "will only prolong the war". He said that Ukraine must have "robust security guarantees", but that the "United States does not believe that NATO membership for Ukraine is a realistic outcome of a negotiated settlement". The US expects Europe to provide more financial and military assistance for Ukraine, while the US concentrates on its own security. Hegseth said that no US troops would be deployed as peacekeepers to Ukraine.

Later that day Trump said he held a "highly productive phone call" with Russian president Vladimir Putin agreed to "have our respective teams start negotiations immediately". They also agreed to visit each other's countries. Trump also held a phone call with president Zelenskyy, who said: "Together with the US, we are charting our next steps to stop Russian aggression and ensure a lasting, reliable peace".

Ukraine and its European allies were alarmed by Trump unilaterally opening negotiations with Putin and apparently giving concessions to Russia. Zelenskyy said that Ukraine would not accept an agreement made without it, while Foreign Minister Andrii Sybiha said: "Nothing can be discussed on Ukraine without Ukraine". John Bolton, the national security adviser during Trump's first term, said: "Trump has effectively surrendered to Putin before the negotiations have even begun ... The positions that Defense Secretary Hegseth announced ... constitute terms of a settlement that could have been written in the Kremlin".

The following day, Hegseth seemed to backtrack on his remarks and said that "everything is on the table" for negotiations. On February 16, Rubio stated that Ukraine and Europe would be part of any "real negotiations" to end the war. Trump said on the same day that Ukrainian president Zelenskyy "will be involved" in peace negotiations.

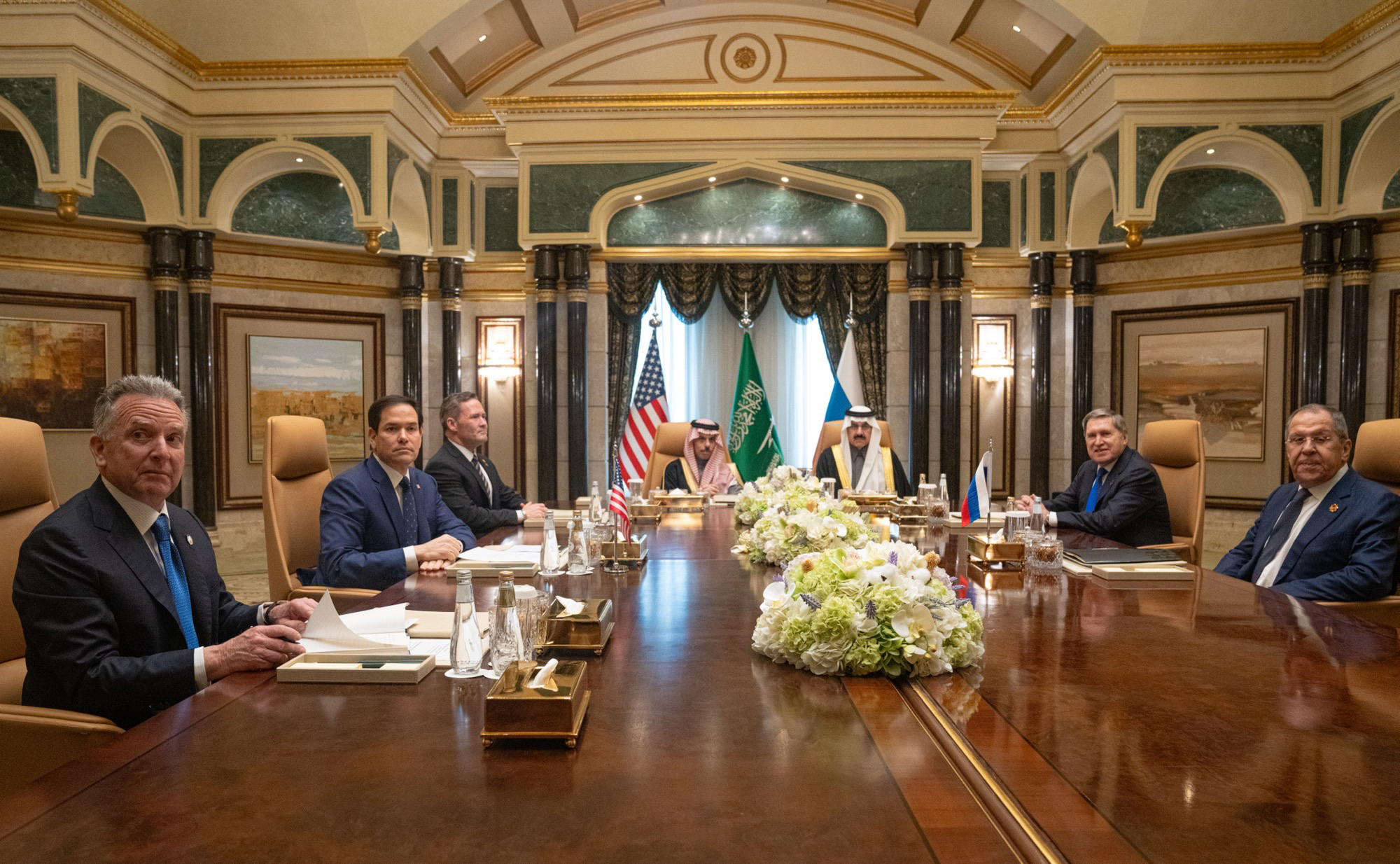
U.S., Saudi, and Russian officials meeting in Riyadh, February 18, 2025

On February 18, 2025, American and Russian delegations, headed by Rubio and Russian foreign minister Sergey Lavrov, respectively, met in Riyadh, Saudi Arabia, to develop a framework for further negotiations on ending Russia's war in Ukraine. Rubio was accompanied by U.S. National Security Advisor Michael Waltz and Special Envoy Steve Witkoff. Ukraine was not invited to the talks in Saudi Arabia.

According to Rubio, Trump wanted to know if Russia is serious about ending the war, and "the only way is to test them, to basically engage them and say, 'Okay, are you serious about ending the war? And if so, what are your demands? Are your public demands and your private demands different?'"

On February 27, 2025, Trump extended a series of sanctions against Russia over its invasion of Ukraine for one year.

===== Proposed Ukrainian minerals deal =====
It was reported on February 17, 2025, that the Trump administration had asked for the US to be given ownership of half of Ukraine's mineral and oil resources, as "payment" for US support. Several days earlier, Trump had said:

"They [Ukraine] may make a deal. They may not make a deal. They may be Russian someday, or they may not be Russian someday. But I want this money back".

General terms and conditions of the agreement:

- Ukraine has to give up 50% of its revenues from natural resources, including minerals, gas, oil, as well as revenues from ports, power plants and other infrastructure. The revenues should be directed to a fund in which the United States has 100% ownership. Ukraine should make contributions to the fund until it reaches $500 billion. The United States will have the right to receive revenues even from territories that Ukraine will liberate from Russian occupation in the future.
- The agreement does not provide any security guarantees for Ukraine and military support for Ukraine, and aims only to return the non-refundable aid that Ukraine received from the United States during the Russian invasion. At the same time, the United States has the right to reinvest part of the proceeds in Ukraine's post-war reconstruction if it is profitable for the United States.

The Ukrainians did not sign the agreement. Although Zelenskyy had offered the US a stake in Ukraine's resources for continued support, he reportedly rejected the proposal. Zelenskyy said he was prepared to work on a "serious document" if it contained security guarantees, but said he could not "sell Ukraine away". According to The Telegraph, "Trump's demands would amount to a higher share of Ukrainian GDP than reparations imposed on Germany at the Versailles Treaty". On February 20, national security adviser Mike Waltz said that "Trump is obviously very frustrated" with Zelenskyy for not being "willing to take this opportunity that we have offered" with the minerals deal.

On February 23, 2025, President of Ukraine Volodymyr Zelenskyy at a press conference at the forum "Ukraine. Year 2025" forum, thanked the United States for its assistance and appreciated Trump's interest in the investment agreement, but expressed doubts about its benefits for Ukraine and its content:

First, let's look at the figure [$500 billion]. I know that Ukraine received $100 billion [from the US]. And this is a fact. That's why I'm not going to recognize $500 billion, no matter what anyone says. With all due respect to my partners, I am standing firm because this is the true situation and we [Ukrainians] are absolutely right. Secondly, I am not ready to fix even $100 billion [in the agreement], because we should not recognize the grant [non-refundable aid] as a debt. Whether Trump likes it or not... A grant is not a debt.

The agreement was scheduled to be signed at 1pm (UTC−5) February 28, 2025, during a meeting at the White House, but after Trump and Vance got in a heated exchange with Zelenskyy on live television, the agreement was canceled.

American and European politicians point out that Trump lost the most lucrative deal of his life, which promised to bring the United States hundreds of billions of dollars, Zelenskyy lost a strategic security partner, and only Putin was the winner in this situation.

===== Attacks on Ukraine's leadership =====
On February 18, 2025, following the Riyadh meeting and Ukraine's rejection of the resources agreement, Trump seemingly blamed Ukraine for the Russian invasion. He said "You should have never started it. You could have made a deal". He said that Ukraine should have new presidential elections, falsely claiming that president Zelenskyy's approval ratings were only 4%. This echoed Kremlin claims that the Ukrainian leader was illegitimate. Zelenskyy replied that Trump was living in a Russian "disinformation bubble". Recent polls found that 57% of Ukrainians trusted Zelenskyy. The head of Ukraine's digital affairs ministry argued that Zelenskyy's ratings were actually 4–5% higher than Trump's. Ukraine's constitution forbids elections during martial law; all parties in Ukraine's parliament want to put off elections until after the war; and polls show that few Ukrainians want an election in the midst of an invasion. On February 19, 2025, Trump wrote on social media that Zelenskyy was a "Dictator without Elections". Vice-president Vance warned Zelenskyy not to be "badmouthing" Trump. On February 21, Trump said that Zelenskyy had been negotiating "with no cards" regarding the Russia-Ukraine war "for three years, and nothing got done", so Trump said of Zelenskyy: "I don't think he's very important to be at meetings" regarding the Russia-Ukraine war.

Trump's February 19 comments were criticized by many US allies. British prime minister Keir Starmer said that Zelenskyy is Ukraine's "democratically elected leader" and it is "perfectly reasonable" for Ukraine to "suspend elections during wartime as the UK did during World War Two". French president Emmanuel Macron said that Zelenskyy is Ukraine's "democratically elected leader". The French president added that this was "not the case for Vladimir Putin, who has been killing his opponents and manipulating his elections for a long time." German chancellor Olaf Scholz called Trump's comments "false and dangerous". Australia's Defence Minister Richard Marles replied that "the aggressor here is Russia". UN spokesperson Stephane Dujarric further pointed out that Trump's comments were incorrect. Several of Trump's fellow Republicans in Congress also disagreed that Zelenskyy was a dictator or that Ukraine bore responsibility for Russia's invasion. Another Trump ally, Reform UK leader Nigel Farage, disagreed with Trump's statements.

On February 21, Trump said that Russia attacked Ukraine, but blamed Zelenskyy and Biden for failing to prevent that. He further said that Zelenskyy and Putin should negotiate to prevent further killings of young soldiers and the deaths of "millions" of people.

===== February 2025 Zelenskyy meeting =====
President Trump and Ukrainian Volodymyr Zelenskyy hold a bilateral meeting in the Oval Office, February 28, 2025

On February 28, 2025, Trump and Zelenskyy held a highly contentious, televised bilateral meeting in the Oval Office. The meeting abruptly ended without a clear resolution and without the expected signing of an agreement concerning Ukraine's rare earth minerals. Trump and Vance repeatedly criticized, made accusations, and raised their voices at Zelenskyy during the televised meeting. The incident marked the first time in U.S. history that a sitting president verbally attacked a visiting head of state on camera in such a manner.

Leading up to the meeting, there were tensions between the Trump administration, which wanted Ukraine to make concessions to Russia in order to swiftly end the war, and Zelenskyy's government, which distrusted Russia's commitment to abide by its agreements without U.S. security guarantee of Ukraine.

The meeting was widely characterized by its confrontational and antagonistic tone, drawing significant criticism from the media and the international community. Nearly all U.S. allies, along with other global figures, swiftly voiced their support for Zelenskyy following the confrontation, with many issuing statements that appeared to rebuke Trump's confrontational approach. In contrast, Russian officials praised the outcome of the meeting and directed criticism toward Zelenskyy. In the U.S., reactions were divided along partisan lines – members of Trump's party, the Republican Party, largely commended his conduct, while members of the Democratic Party widely condemned it. The meeting ended with Zelenskyy being asked to leave and a severance of negotiations. Three days after the meeting, the Trump administration suspended all military aid to Ukraine.

===== Suspension of U.S. support to Ukraine =====
On March 3, 2025, following the contentious February 28 meeting with Ukrainian president Volodymyr Zelenskyy, Trump ordered an indefinite pause on all U.S. military aid to Ukraine, citing dissatisfaction with Zelenskyy's commitment to peace negotiations with Russia. The decision impacts over $1 billion in arms and ammunition that had been slated for delivery to Ukraine. The White House stated that the pause was necessary to ensure that U.S. assistance was "contributing to a solution" rather than prolonging the conflict. Critics argue it weakens Ukraine's defense, emboldens Russia, strains U.S. alliances, and worsens the humanitarian crisis.

On March 3, 2025, an anonymous but reportedly credible U.S. official claimed that Defense Secretary Pete Hegseth ordered a pause on offensive cyberoperations against Russia by U.S. Cyber Command, scaling back efforts to counter digital threats from a key adversary. The decision, according to the U.S. official, does not impact cyberoperations by the CIA or the Cybersecurity and Infrastructure Security Agency but follows other Trump administration rollbacks on cyber-related efforts at the FBI and other agencies. However, the Pentagon has since denied these claims, stating that no such order was given:

TO BE CLEAR: @SecDef has neither canceled nor delayed any cyber operations directed against malicious Russian targets and there has been no stand-down order whatsoever from that priority.

— U.S. Department of Defense Rapid Response, X

In response to the support and aid suspension, Zelenskyy expressed regret over the White House meeting, calling it "regrettable" and stating that it "did not go the way it was supposed to." He reaffirmed Ukraine's willingness to negotiate for peace and emphasized his desire for "constructive cooperation" with the United States. Zelenskyy also reiterated that Ukraine remains ready to sign a minerals deal with the U.S. "at any time and in any convenient format." The proposed deal would allocate half of all revenues from Ukraine's natural resources to a joint investment fund with the U.S., which Zelenskyy hoped would strengthen security guarantees and economic support for Ukraine.

On March 5, 2025, the U.S. paused intelligence-sharing with Ukraine, increasing pressure on President Volodymyr Zelenskyy to negotiate peace with Russia. CIA Director John Ratcliffe suggested the move was temporary, stating, "the pause I think will go away." The decision, following a halt in U.S. military aid, sparked criticism, warning it would cost Ukrainian lives.

===== U.S. resumes aid to Ukraine =====
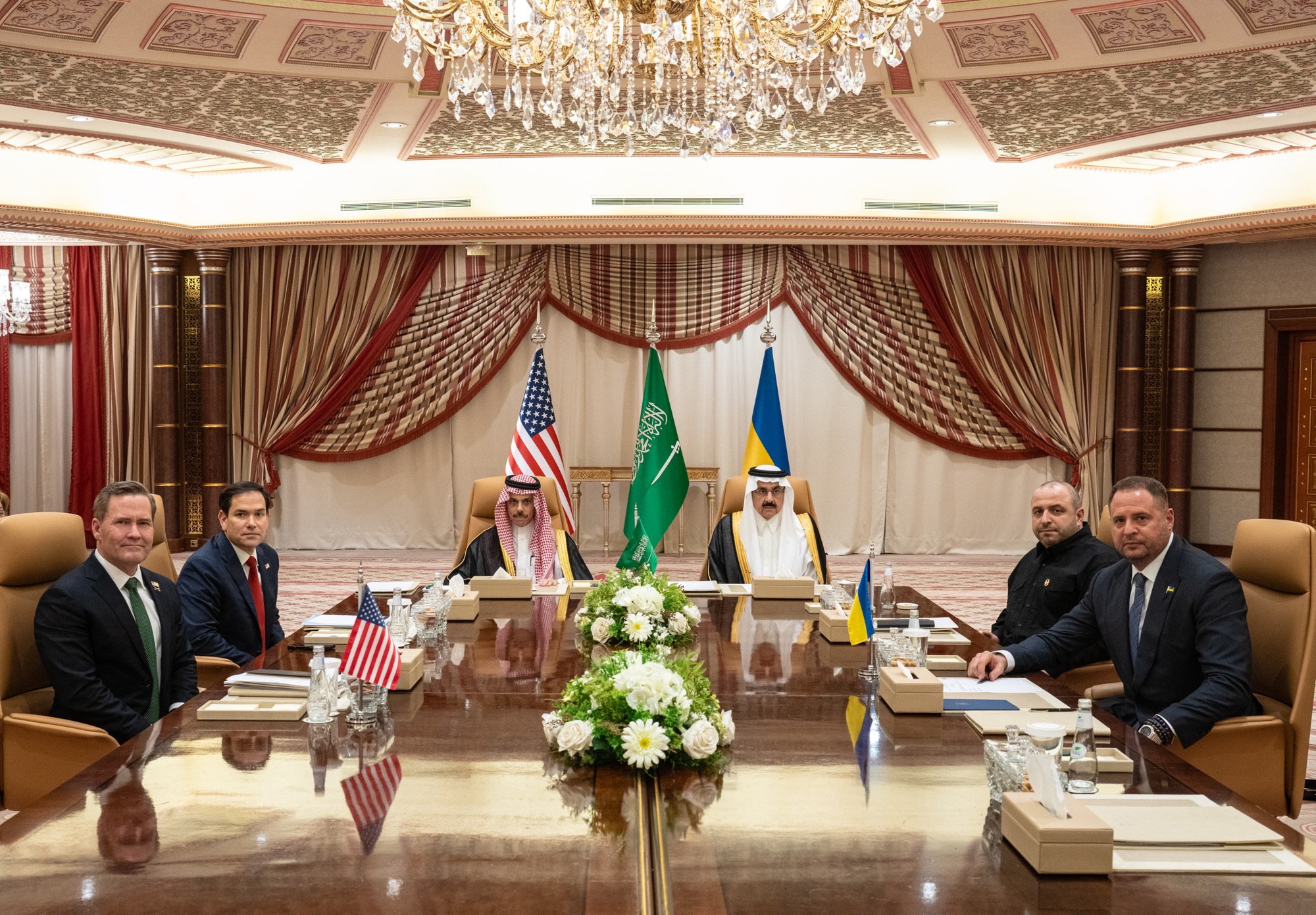
U.S., Saudi, and Ukrainian officials meeting in Jeddah, March 11, 2025

On March 11, 2025, Ukraine agreed to a U.S.-proposed 30-day ceasefire with Russia, pending Moscow's acceptance. The announcement followed negotiations in Jeddah, Saudi Arabia, where U.S. and Ukrainian officials reaffirmed their commitment to diplomacy. As part of the agreement, the Trump administration lifted its suspension of military aid and intelligence sharing with Ukraine. Rubio expressed hope that Russia would accept the ceasefire, stating, "The ball is now in their court." Ukrainian officials stressed the need for security guarantees to prevent future Russian invasions, warning that a temporary truce could allow Russia to reinforce its military position. Russian forces continue to occupy nearly one-fifth of Ukraine's territory.

In mid-March 2025, Putin claimed a ceasefire would favor Ukraine and demanded Ukrainian forces in Kursk to surrender or die, then rejected an unconditional ceasefire after a call with Trump, stalling negotiations.

===== Failed ceasefire talks =====
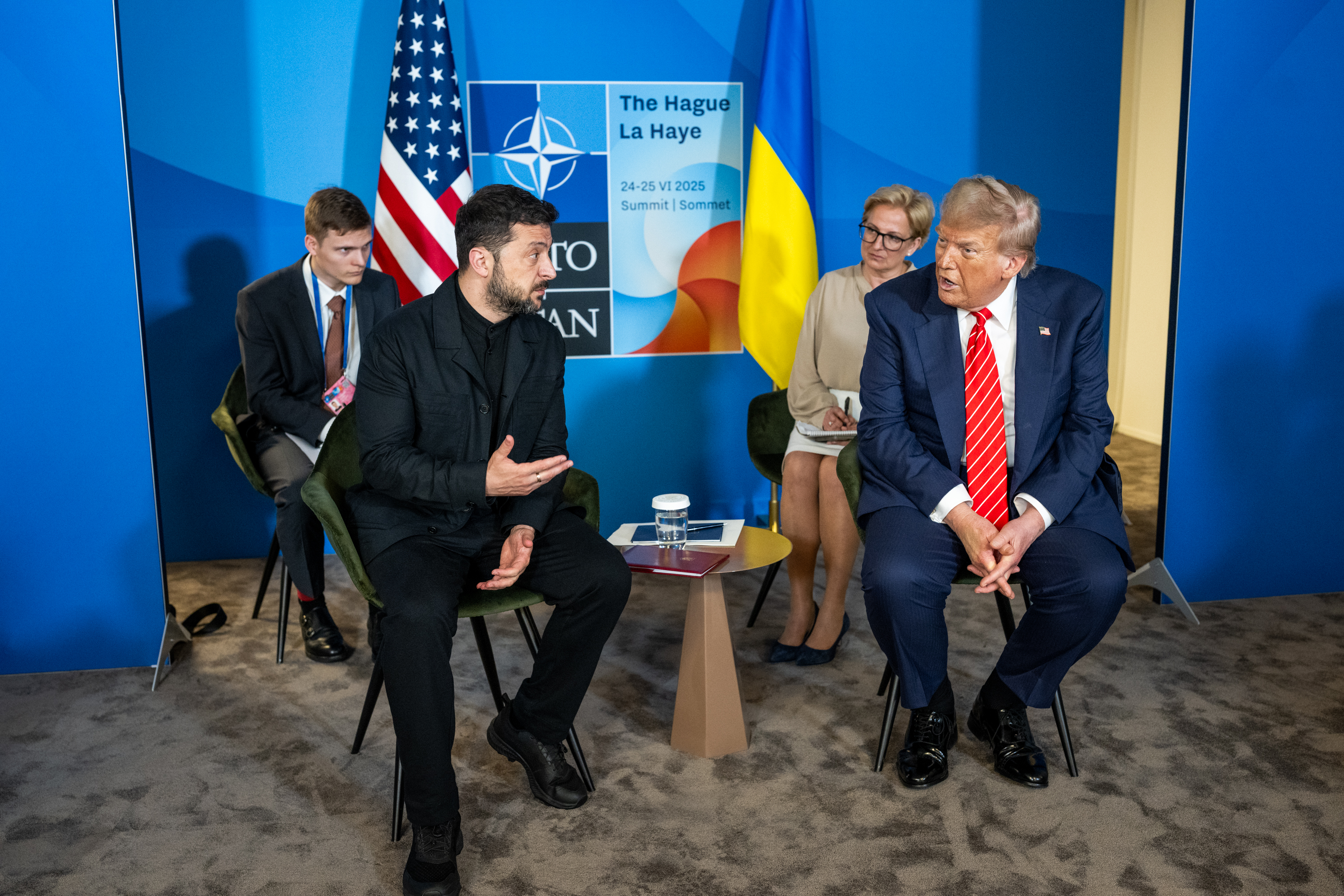
Trump and Ukrainian president Volodymyr Zelenskyy at NATO summit in The Hague, June 25, 2025

In March 2025, the United States brokered a limited truce between Russia and Ukraine, whereby they would halt strikes on energy infrastructure for 30 days starting March 18. Framed by the Trump administration as a pragmatic step to reduce escalation, critics argue it benefits Putin by protecting his oil refineries from Ukrainian drone attacks at a moment when those strikes are doing real damage. Analysts believed Putin would use the pause to buy time, betting that the US will gradually offer him more and more concessions. He likely sees Ukraine's Biden-era stockpiles running low and expects Trump will not replenish them at the same level, weakening Ukraine's long-term ability to fight.

On April 24, 2025, Trump criticized Russia's missile and drone attack on Kyiv and Putin's determination to continue the war, posting on social media: "Not necessary, and very bad timing. Vladimir, Stop! 5000 soldiers a week are dying. Lets get the Peace Deal Done!"

Trump repeatedly threatened to impose further sanctions on Russia if it did not stop attacking Ukraine. Putin repeatedly ignored the warnings, and Trump did not follow through on them.

On May 8, 2025, Trump warned that the U.S. would impose further sanctions on Russia if it did not agree to a 30-day unconditional ceasefire. Russia rejected the ceasefire and continued to attack Ukraine.

Putin and Zelenskyy were due to hold direct negotiations in Istanbul on May 15, and Trump suggested he would also be there. However, Putin did not attend. Trump excused Putin's absence, saying he believes the only reason Putin did not attend was because he was not there, and said peace talks are only possible if he and Putin meet.

On May 25, after Russia launched its biggest drone attack of the war and killed 13 people, Trump wrote on social media: "I've always had a very good relationship with Vladimir Putin of Russia, but something has happened to him. He has gone absolutely CRAZY!". Trump added "I've always said that he wants ALL of Ukraine, not just a piece of it, and maybe that's proving to be right, but if he does, it will lead to the downfall of Russia!". Trump also said of Zelenskyy, "Everything out of his mouth causes problems, I don't like it, and it better stop". He again warned of sanctions against Russia. The Kremlin described Trump's posts as "emotional".

On May 28, Trump said he would know within two weeks whether Putin was serious about ending the war or was just "tapping us along". In May, June and July, Russian missile and drone attacks on Ukraine increased dramatically.

In June 2025, Trump rejected Putin's offer to mediate a ceasefire in the Twelve-Day War, telling him to focus on mediating a ceasefire in the Russo-Ukrainian War. In July 2025, Trump approved more weapons for Ukraine.

On July 14, Trump announced a major policy reversal by agreeing to send Patriot air‑defense missile systems to Ukraine, financed and reimbursed by NATO and EU allies. He also threatened to impose 100% tariffs and secondary sanctions on countries buying Russian oil if Russia did not agree to a ceasefire within 50 days. On July 28, Trump announced that the deadline would be shortened to 10 or 12 days.

When Trump's deadline arrived on August 8, instead of imposing sanctions, Trump announced that he would host Putin in Alaska on August 15. Shortly before the Alaska meeting, Trump warned that there would be "severe consequences" for Russia if Putin did not agree to a ceasefire. No ceasefire was announced after the summit. Trump changed his mind and agreed with Putin that no ceasefire was needed before a peace agreement.

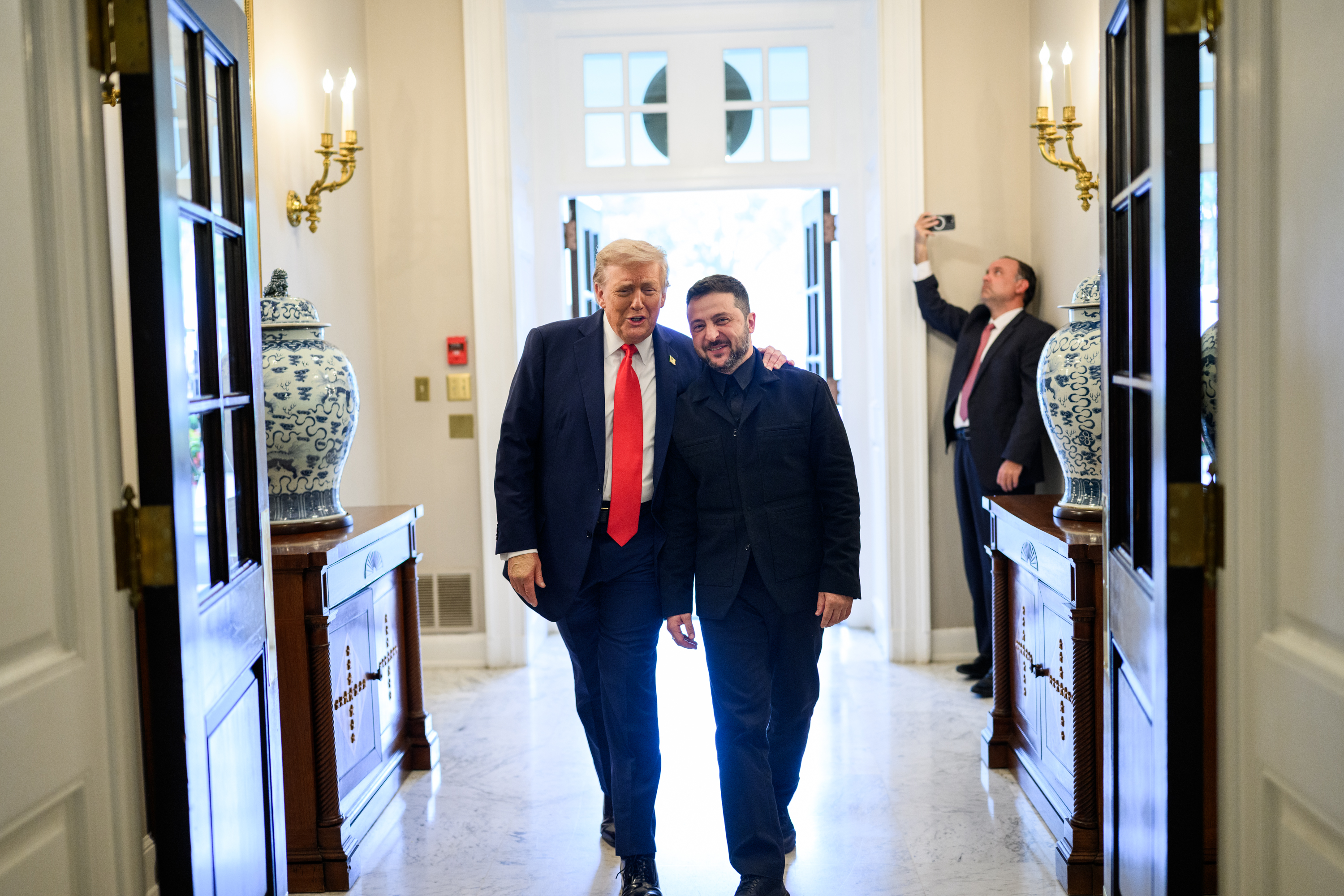
Trump and Zelensky at the White House, August 18, 2025

In September 2025, Trump urged Europe to stop buying Russian oil and start putting economic pressure on China for funding Russia's war effort. Treasury Secretary Scott Bessent said the Trump administration is "prepared to increase pressure on Russia, but we need our European partners to follow us."

In September 2025, the Trump administration approved the delivery of up to $10 billion worth of weapons to Ukraine from US stockpiles, which would be paid for by NATO allies. Trump called Russia an "aggressor". On September 27, 2025, President Zelenskyy announced a $90 billion arms agreement with the United States.

On October 22, 2025, the United States imposed sanctions on Russian energy companies Rosneft and Lukoil, affecting their customers in China and India.

===== 2026 =====
Trump signing the Sanctioning Russia Act in the Oval Office, September 18, 2026

On July 8, 2026, during the NATO summit in Turkey, Trump declared that the US will provide Ukraine a license to build Patriot missiles.

Following a public dispute with Ukrainian president Volodymyr Zelenskyy over the US deal to ease restrictions on Russian diesel exports, Trump said that Ukraine should have a new president. Trump said he wanted to lower fuel prices ahead of the November congressional elections, as the war with Iran had disrupted energy markets and driven prices higher.

=== Northern Europe ===
==== Denmark and Greenland ====
Since 2025 Trump has several times threatened invading or annexing Greenland, triggering the Greenland crisis. In January 2025, Trump stated that he wished to buy Greenland from Denmark, or, take Greenland by force for "national security" purposes. As a result of Trump's actions, the Danish Defence Intelligence Service included the United States as a potential hybrid threat to Danish national security security alongside Russia and China in its threat assessment that year. In 2026 Greenland and Denmark saw massive anti-Trump protests, the Hands off Greenland protests, where protesters chanted "Greenland is not for sale".

During his March 4 address to Congress, Trump vowed the United States would gain control over Greenland "one way or another." A subsequent public opinion poll showed that 85% of Greenlanders were opposed to joining the US. Also in March 2025, amid rocketing wholesale egg prices in the United States due to bird flu reducing egg supply, the Trump administration asked the Danish Egg Association to check how many eggs they could export to the United States.

In a first for a sitting American vice president, JD Vance in March 2025 visited Greenland. There, Vance said regarding Trump: "We can't just ignore the president's desires" for the United States to acquire Greenland, while warning that Greenland faced the "encroachment of powerful countries" China and Russia "as they expand their ambitions". In a "message to Denmark", Vance declared, "you have not done a good job", accusing Denmark of having "underinvested in the security architecture" and "people of Greenland".

On May 6, it was reported by the Wall Street Journal that director of National Intelligence Tulsi Gabbard ordered the Central Intelligence Agency, the Defense Intelligence Agency and the National Security Agency to increase intelligence gathering activities in Greenland, focusing on the Greenland independence movement, public interest toward mineral extraction on the island, sympathetic sentiment towards the United States.

On May 9, CNN reported that the administration was considering moving military operational jurisdiction of Greenland from the United States European Command to the United States Northern Command. On the same day, Reuters reported that a Compact of Free Association primarily being considered to incorporate the island in to the United States' sphere of influence, which would prospectively be proposed to the government of Greenland, though other options were also being considered. On December 22, 25 Trump reiterated his ambitions to take control of Greenland versus Denmark by stating "understands how essential Greenland is to our National Security" concerning his appointment of Louisiana governor Jeff Landry as a special envoy. Danish foreign minister Lars Løkke Rasmussen deemed Landry's appointment "unacceptable."

==== Finland ====
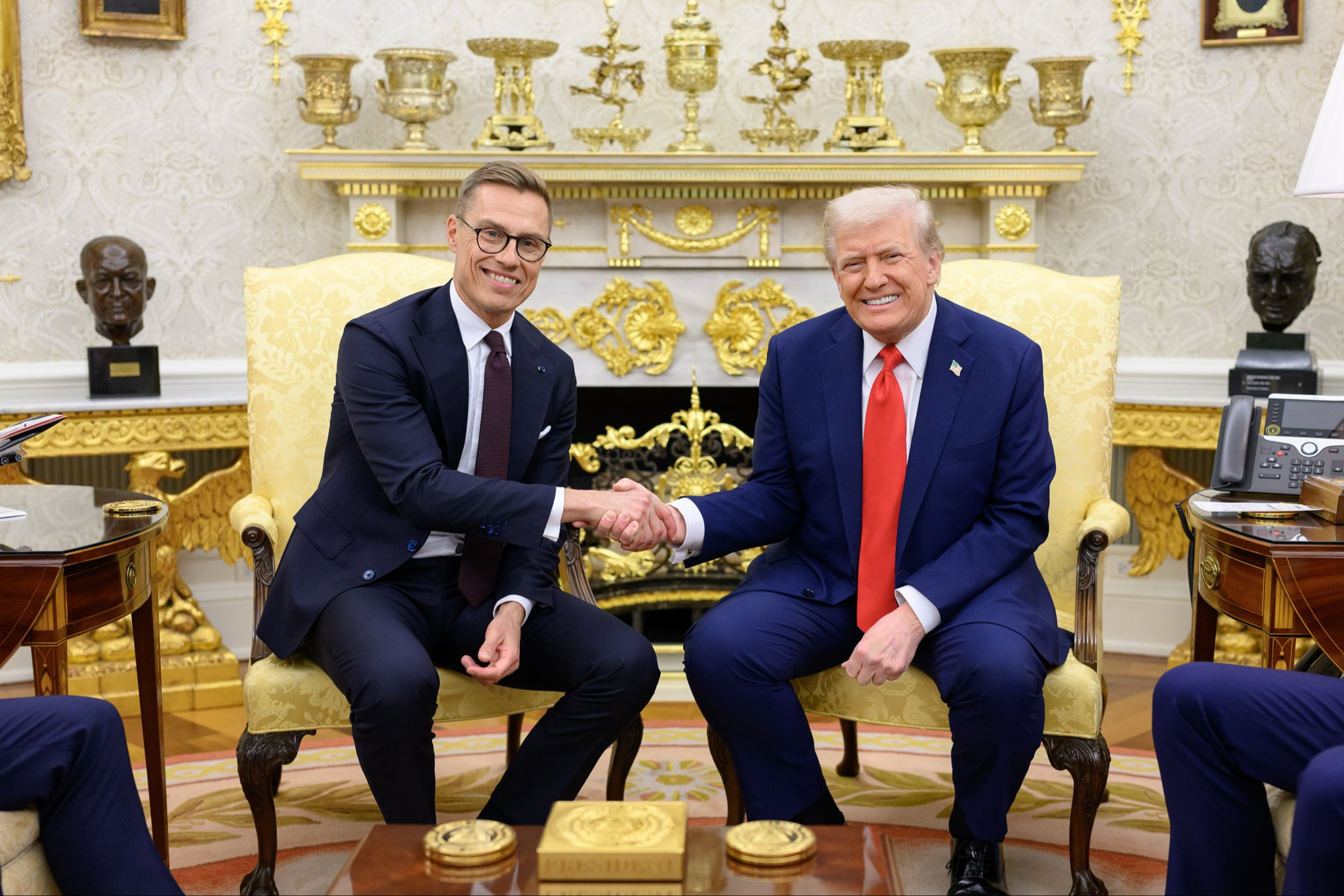
Trump and Finnish president Alexander Stubb, October 2025

In October 2025, Finnish president Alexander Stubb and Prime Minister Petteri Orpo visited the White House, where they agreed with President Donald Trump on icebreaker deals worth around a $6 billion. As a result of the agreement, the US Coast Guard will acquire up to 11 icebreakers. According to the formal letter of intent, Finland will build four icebreakers at Finnish shipyards, after which the US will utilize Finnish expertise to build up to seven new icebreakers at its own shipyards. The US wants to strengthen its national security in the Arctic region with the acquisition. Trump's interest in Finnish icebreakers arose in the 1990s, when he visited Finland with his then girlfriend Marla Maples in 1992, when Trump was interested in the cruise business.

==== Ireland ====
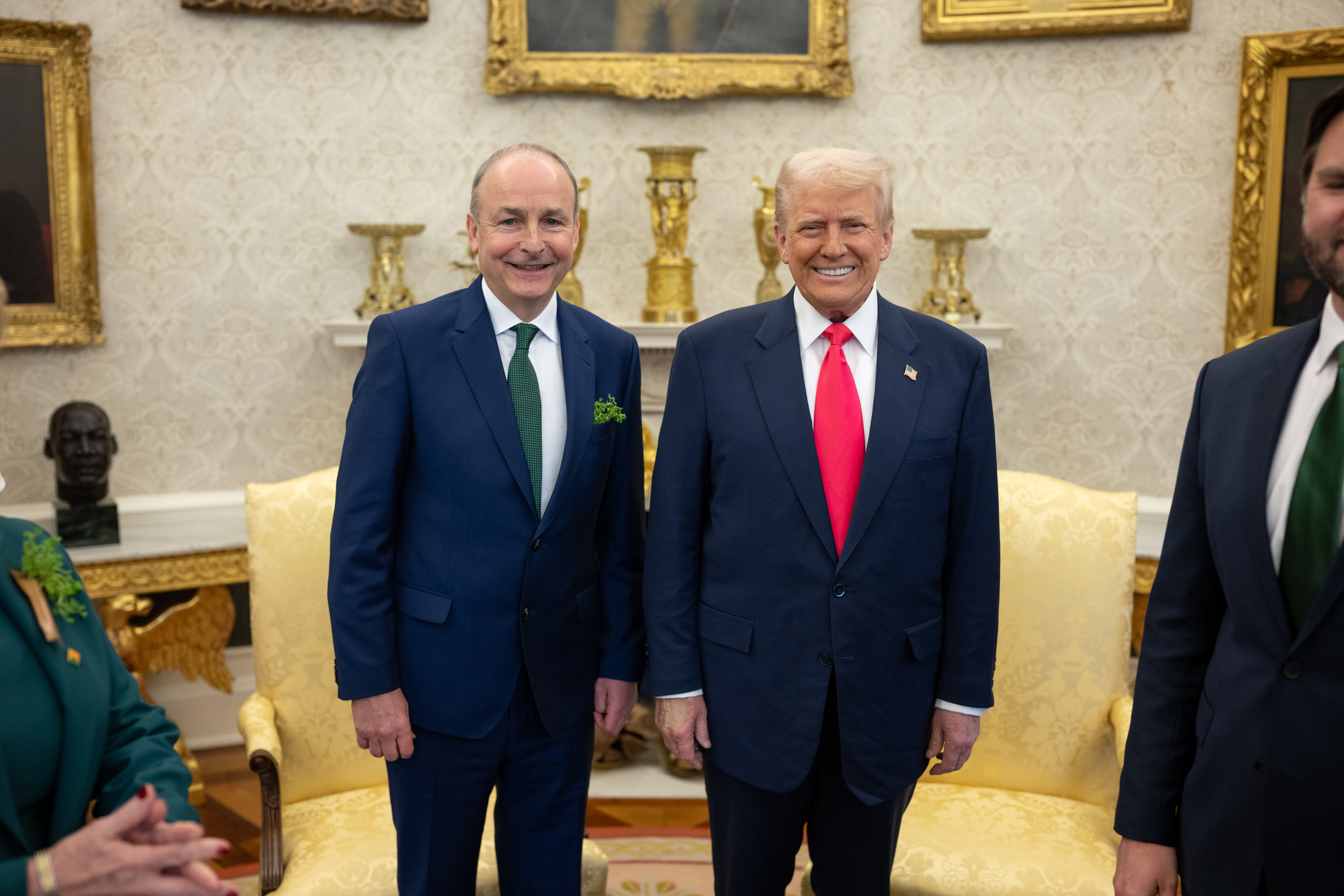
Trump and Irish Taoiseach Micheál Martin, March 2025

In March 2025, Trump said that past American leaders "didn't have a clue what was happening and all of a sudden Ireland has our pharmaceutical companies", and "the United States shouldn't have let it happen"; the high number of American pharmaceutical companies based in Ireland were due to Irish tax policies.

Trump announced his support for Irish reunification during an Ireland visit in september 2026.

==== Norway ====
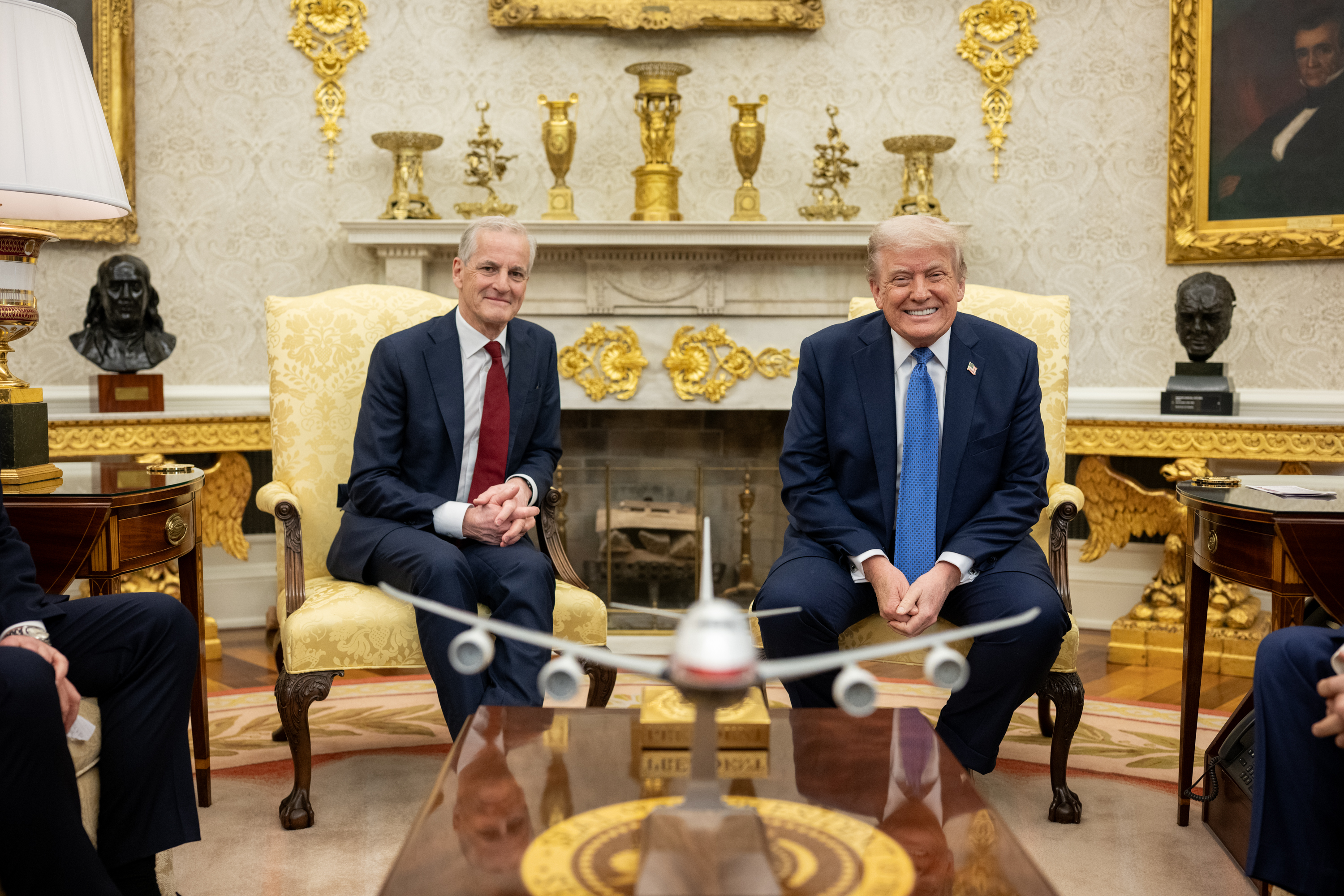
Trump and Norwegian prime minister Jonas Gahr Støre, April 2025

In April 2025, Norwegian prime minister Jonas Gahr Støre and Finance Minister Jens Stoltenberg visited Trump at the White House to discuss the war in Ukraine, trade relations, and Arctic cooperation.

==== United Kingdom ====
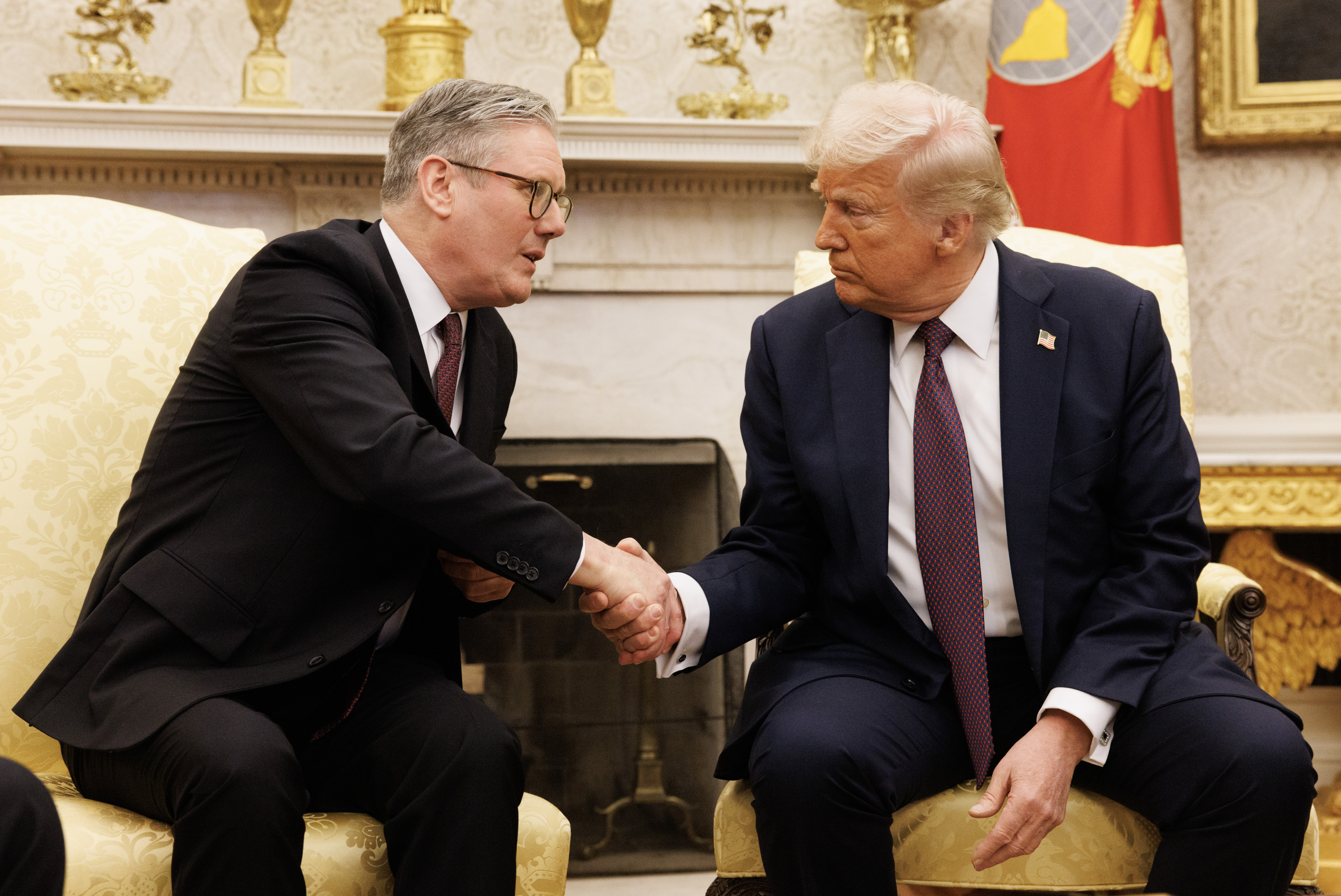
Trump and British prime minister Keir Starmer, February 2025

Trump and British prime minister Andy Burnham, September 2026

In November 2024, UK prime minister Keir Starmer offered his congratulations to Trump on a phone call after he won the 2024 US presidential election, along with other world leaders, saying "I look forward to working with you in the years ahead. I know that the UK-US special relationship will continue to prosper on both sides of the Atlantic for years to come."

Trump held a meeting with Starmer at the White House in February 2025, where he accepted King Charles III's request for Trump to go on a state visit to the UK. Starmer acknowledged Trump's historical ties and affection for the UK, saying that "The United Kingdom and United States will work together to ensure the success of both our countries and deliver for people on both sides of the Atlantic."

=== Southern Europe ===
==== Italy ====
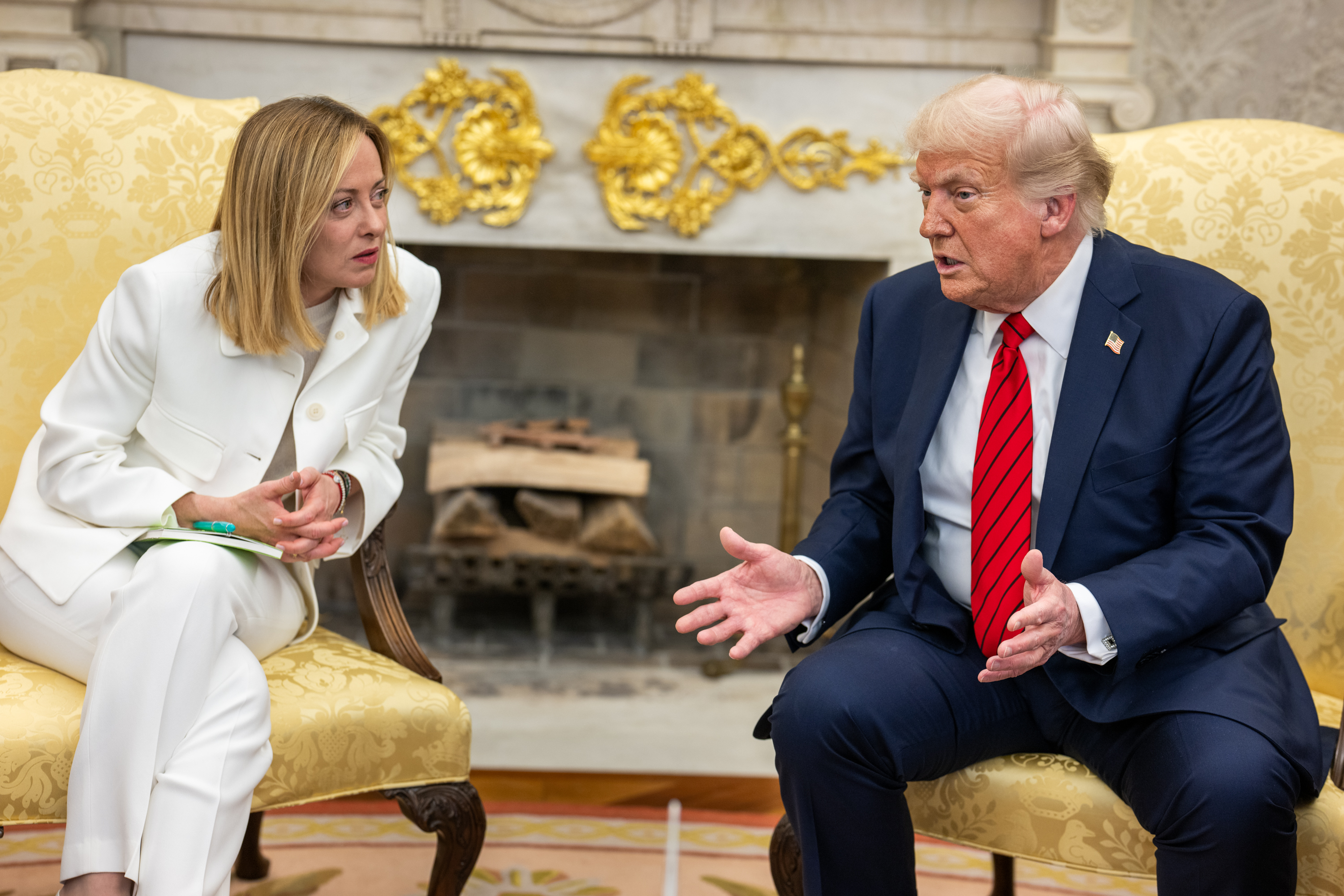
Trump and Italian prime minister Giorgia Meloni, April 2025

In April 2025, Italian prime minister Giorgia Meloni visited the White House for talks with Trump, focusing on strengthening U.S.–Italy relations, trade, and broader transatlantic cooperation. The meeting highlighted the alignment between the two leaders on a range of political issues. Meloni, the only European leader to attend Trump's January 2025 inauguration, sought to position herself as a key interlocutor between the United States and the European Union, though her close alignment with Trump drew concern from some European officials.

In April 2026, Trump and Meloni's once strong relationship would fall apart amid growing tensions over his criticism of Pope Leo XIV, which included him posting an AI image on social of him being a Jesus-like figure, and handling of the 2026 Iran war, with Trump, among other things, even calling Meloni "much different than I thought." The Italian foreign minister said on May the 5th that the rampant attacks against the pontiff were not tolerable.

==== Portugal ====
On March 14, 2025, Portugal's Defense Minister Nuno Melo stated that the country may opt for European jets over U.S. F-35s, citing concerns over Trump's unpredictable NATO stance and perceived pro-Russia shift.

==== Spain ====
Spain rejected NATO's 2025 mandate for all member countries to raise defense expenditures to 5% of GDP by 2035. Spain, led by Prime Minister Pedro Sánchez, insisted it will cap its defense budget at 2.1% of GDP, citing fiscal and social spending concerns. In a letter to NATO secretary general Mark Rutte, he described the 5% goal as "unreasonable and counterproductive". Analysts highlighted that Spain often exceeds its stated military budget by 20-30%, and former ambassador to NATO Pascual de la Parte expressed concern that a specific percentage figure would be an arbitrary target because not all NATO members account for defense expenditure in the same way. This stance triggered friction with the US, with Donald Trump threatening that subsequent trade agreements would include retaliatory measures due to Spain's refusal.

On March 2, 2026, amid the expanding conflict between the US, Israel, and Iran, the Spanish government refused a US request to use jointly-operated military bases at Rota and Morón for operations against Iran. The refusal came two days after Sánchez condemned what he described as "unilateral military action". A day later, Trump announced that the US would cut off all trade with Spain, citing the base dispute and Spain's defense spending stance.

=== Western and Central Europe ===
==== France ====
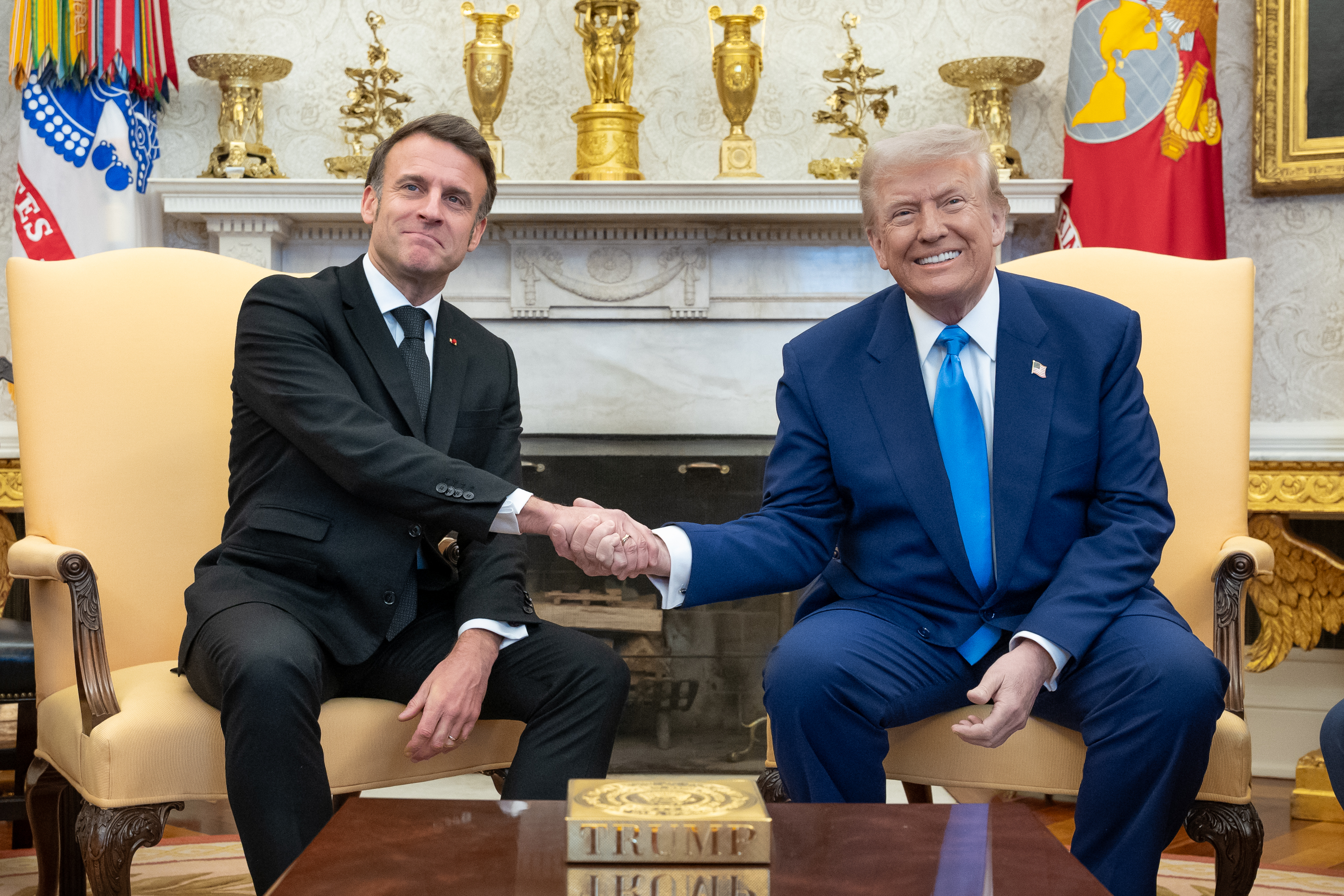
Trump and French president Emmanuel Macron, February 2025

A month after the election, Trump traveled to Paris to attend the reopening of Notre-Dame de Paris on December 7, five years after it was severely damaged by a fire. It was his first foreign trip as president-elect since his second electoral victory. He met with a number of world leaders ahead of the ceremony, including French president Emmanuel Macron, Ukrainian president Volodymyr Zelenskyy, and Prince William of the United Kingdom.

==== Germany ====
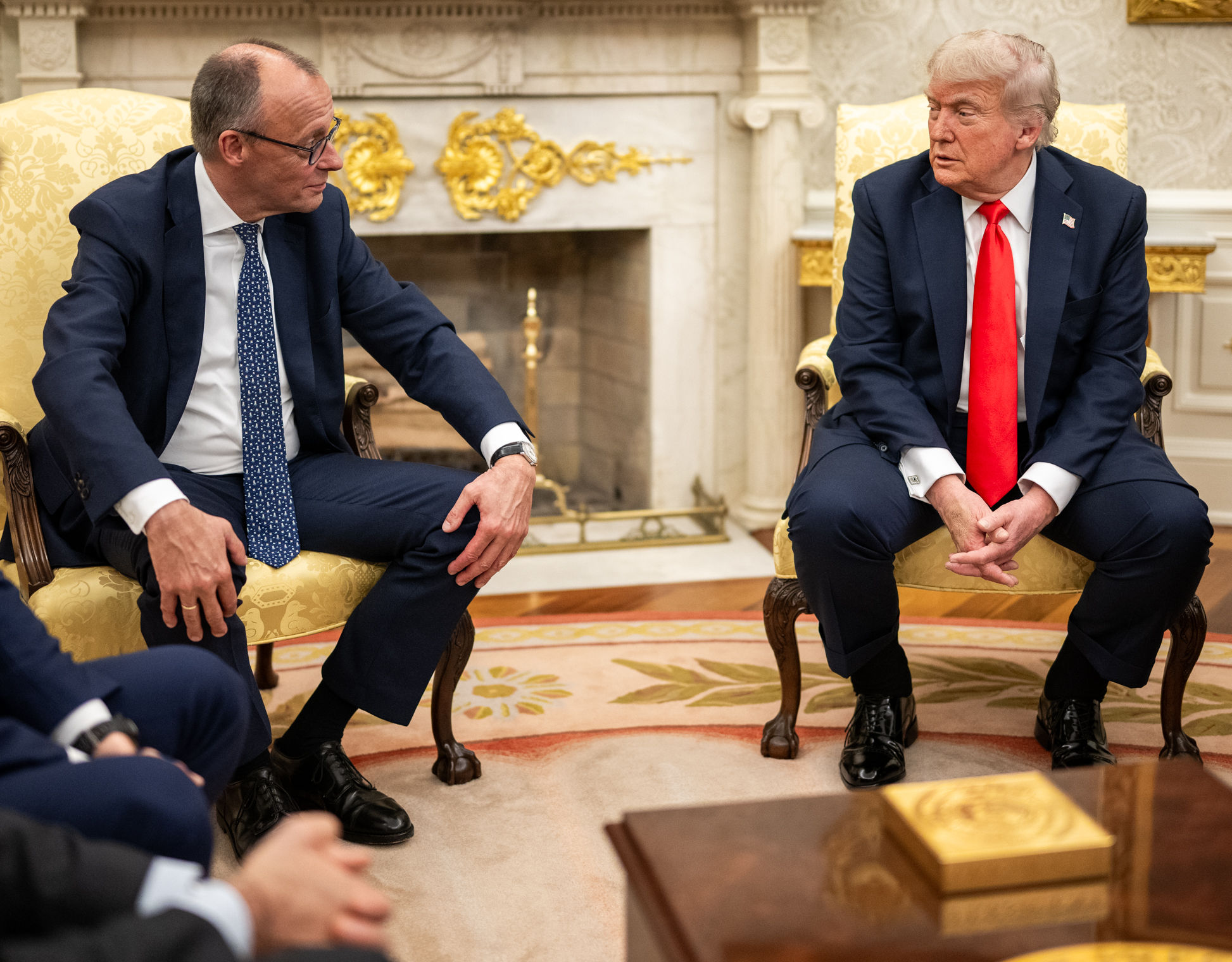
Trump and German Chancellor Friedrich Merz, June 2025

In February 2025, Vice President JD Vance visited the leader of the far-right German political party Alternative for Germany and criticized the approach of mainstream parties towards it.

In March 2025, presumptive German chancellor Friedrich Merz proposed a significant increase in defense spending in Germany, justifying his policy by the "rapidly changing situation", especially after the clash between Trump and Zelenskyy in the White House. German lawmakers approved an amendment to the Basic Law, allowing Merz's government to implement the most massive rearmament in Germany since World War II.

On April 29, 2026, Trump wrote on Truth Social:

The Chancellor of Germany, Friedrich Merz, thinks it’s OK for Iran to have a Nuclear Weapon. He doesn’t know what he’s talking about! If Iran had a Nuclear Weapon, the whole World would be held hostage. I am doing something with Iran, right now, that other Nations, or Presidents, should have done long ago. No wonder Germany is doing so poorly, both Economically, and otherwise!

There was a second episode to Trump's jab at Merz, two days later Trump continued:

...fixing his broken Country, especially Immigration and Energy, and less time interfering with those that are getting rid of the Iran Nuclear threat.

The jabs were posted after Merz gave an interview. More or less out of nowhere (taken that he needs Ramstein as hub and so on in this situation more than ever), Trump then threatened the number of troops in Germany to be reduced.

== Indian Ocean ==
Trump has issued statements both in support and against a deal to transfer sovereignty of the Chagos Islands from the United Kingdom to Mauritius and for the United Kingdom to lease back Diego Garcia.

== North America ==
=== Canada ===
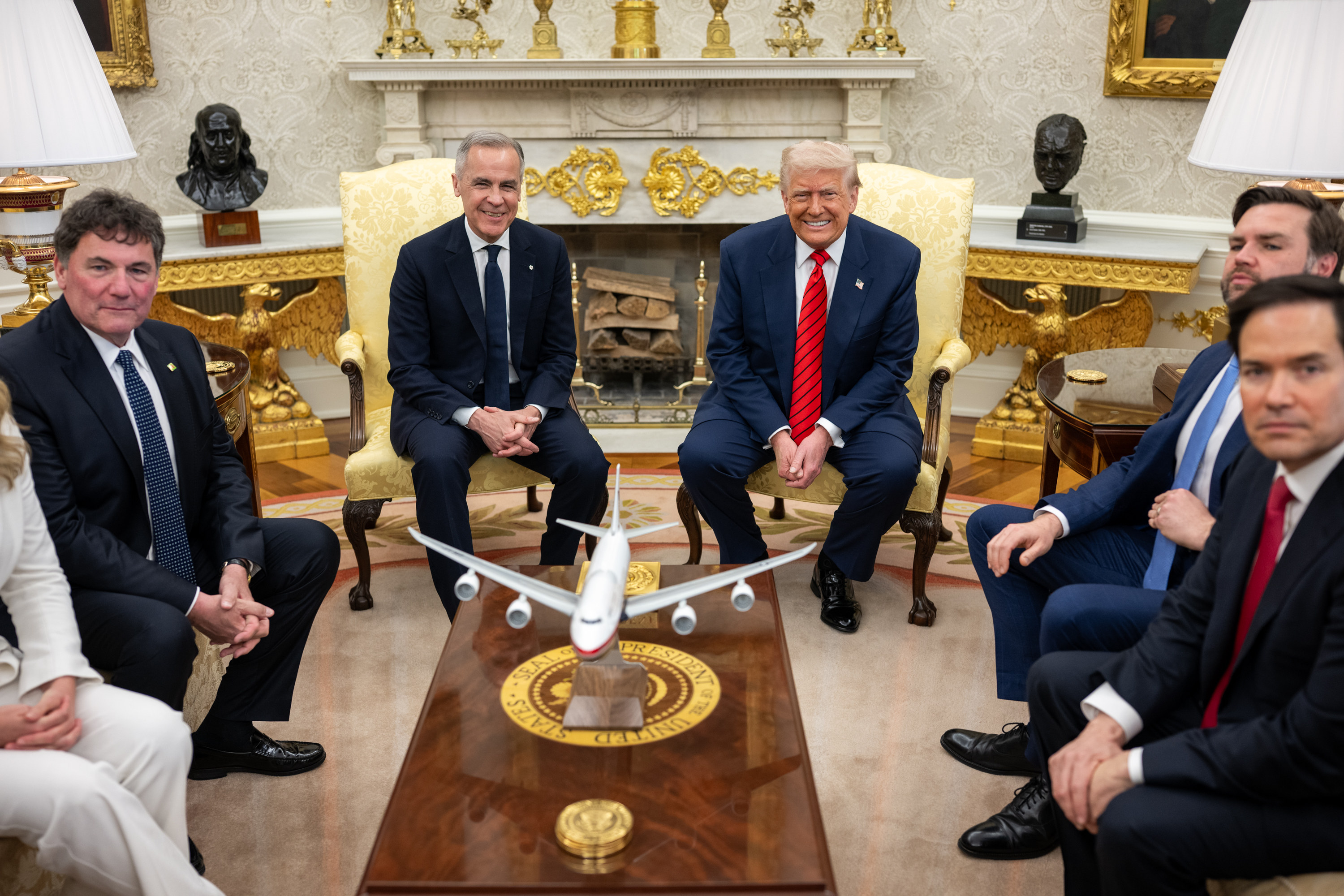
Trump and Canadian prime minister Mark Carney, May 2025

On March 4, 2025, Trump imposed a 25% tariff on all Canadian imports, excluding energy products, which were subjected to a 10% tariff. According to the administration, the goal was to reduce the U.S. trade deficit and encourage stronger Canadian border enforcement, particularly regarding illegal immigration and fentanyl trafficking. Supporters of the policy also cited high Canadian tariffs on U.S. agricultural goods—such as tariffs of up to 240% on dairy and 150% on poultry and eggs—as evidence of a trade imbalance. In response, Canadian prime minister Justin Trudeau announced 25% tariffs on $30 billion worth of U.S. goods, with an additional $125 billion in tariffs planned for the following weeks. Trudeau criticized the U.S. tariffs as unjustified and economically damaging, encouraging Canadians to support domestic products and services. On March 6, Trump delayed tariffs on goods compliant with the United States–Mexico–Canada Agreement (USMCA)—accounting for approximately 38 percent of imports from Canada and 50 percent of imports from Mexico. Although the exemption was expected to end on April 2, the U.S. said it would continue indefinitely.

==== Annexation remarks ====
Trump has referred to Canada as a "state" and Prime Minister Justin Trudeau as the "Governor" since meeting with Trudeau at Mar-a-Lago in late November 2024. In a January press conference, Trump said he was considering annexing Canada by economic force. Trump has threatened and paused tariffs on Canadian goods repeatedly since taking office, and suggested Canada could avoid tariffs by becoming the 51st U.S. state, a notion he has reiterated on multiple occasions. Initially dismissed as jest, these comments have since been taken seriously by Canadian officials. Prime Minister Justin Trudeau expressed concerns that Trump's annexation ambitions might be driven by a desire to access Canada's mineral resources, emphasizing the importance of safeguarding Canadian sovereignty. In additional, Trump mentioned in official diplomatic communication that he wants to challenge the Treaty of 1908 that established the Canada–United States border.

While meeting with Trudeau's successor Mark Carney on May 6, 2025, he suggested that annexation would improve healthcare services and lower taxes paid by Canadians and allow them to be protected by the United States Armed Forces, while also politically unifying North America, but acknowledged that "it takes two to tango" and said in his meeting with Carney that it would not be discussed unless brought up by Carney, though he did not rule out the possibility of Canada being part of the United States in the future, but only if it were feasible and mutually beneficial. The status concerning the issue of Canada becoming the 51st state was reiterated by U.S. ambassador Pete Hoekstra in an interview with the National Post on May 8, 2025. He explained that the issue was settled and would not be mentioned further, and though it would occasionally be brought by Trump himself, it would only be addressed as an issue if Carney decided to discuss it as such.

==== Decoupling Canada–American ties ====
In 2025, Trump's foreign policy, characterized by protectionist measures and strained alliances, led Canada to reassess its defense partnerships. In response to trade disputes and perceived threats to sovereignty, Prime Minister Mark Carney initiated discussions with the European Union to reduce reliance on U.S. military equipment. These talks included exploring the procurement of European-made fighter jets, such as Sweden's Saab Gripen, with proposals for domestic assembly in Canada. Defense Minister Bill Blair was tasked with reviewing the existing contract for 88 American F-35 fighter jets, considering alternatives that could bolster Canada's domestic defense industry and diversify its international partnerships.

==== Support for Alberta separatists ====
Officials from the Trump administration held several private meetings in Washington with representatives of the Alberta Prosperity Project, an Albertan separatist group advocating for Alberta's independence. The meetings reportedly occurred three times between April 2025 and January 2026. Treasury Secretary Scott Bessent described Alberta as "a natural partner for the U.S." and referred to speculation about a possible referendum on whether the oil-rich Canadian province should remain part of Canada, comments that drew attention among Alberta separatist groups. Prime Minister Mark Carney and Alberta Premier Danielle Smith stated that the U.S. should respect Canadian sovereignty. Carney said he had made clear to Trump that Canada expected its sovereignty to be respected.

=== Costa Rica ===
In April 2025, Costa Rican politician and Nobel Peace laureate Óscar Arias's visa was reportedly revoked.

In early April 2026, Costa Rican Minister for Public Security Mario Zamora confirmed that her government had agreed to accept deportees from third countries in return for financial and logistical assistance from the United States and International Organization for Migration (IOM). Under the arrangement, Costa Rica would accept up to 25 migrants per week and would providing food and housing. These third-country deportees would have no criminal records. On April 12, Costa Rica received its the first batch of 25 deportees, which included citizens of Albania, Cameroon, China, Guatemala, Honduras, India, Kenya and Morocco.

=== Cuba ===
Trump in March 2026 says "I do believe I'll be the honor of, having the honor of, taking Cuba (...) in some form (...) I think I could do anything I want with it"

In one of his first acts of his second administration, Trump reinstated Cuba as a state sponsors of terrorism, reversing an action made by President Biden in the weeks prior in exchange for political prisoners. He also restored a list of "restricted entities" established during his first administration. First Secretary of the Communist Party of Cuba Miguel Díaz-Canel referred to the moves as "an act of arrogance and disregard for truth."

Later in January 2025, Trump announced he would use the Guantanamo Bay detention camp as a holding facility for up to 30,000 criminal migrants amidst his administration's efforts of mass deportation across the United States. Defense Secretary Pete Hegseth specified that the facility would be run by the U.S. Immigration and Customs Enforcement and will be used as "temporary transit" in order to "humanely move illegals...back to the countries where they came from in a proper process." Flights carrying migrants to Guantanamo began on February 4, with the first consisting of 10 suspected members of Tren de Aragua out of El Paso, Texas.

In January 2026, Trump signed an executive order that would allow the US to impose tariffs on imports from countries supplying Cuba with oil. The administration claimed that Cuba has links to Hamas and Hezbollah and represents "an unusual and extraordinary threat to US national security and foreign policy". UN human rights experts called the executive order, "a serious violation of international law and a grave threat to a democratic and equitable international order".

In March 2026, the Cuban government confirmed it was in talks with the administration.

=== Mexico ===
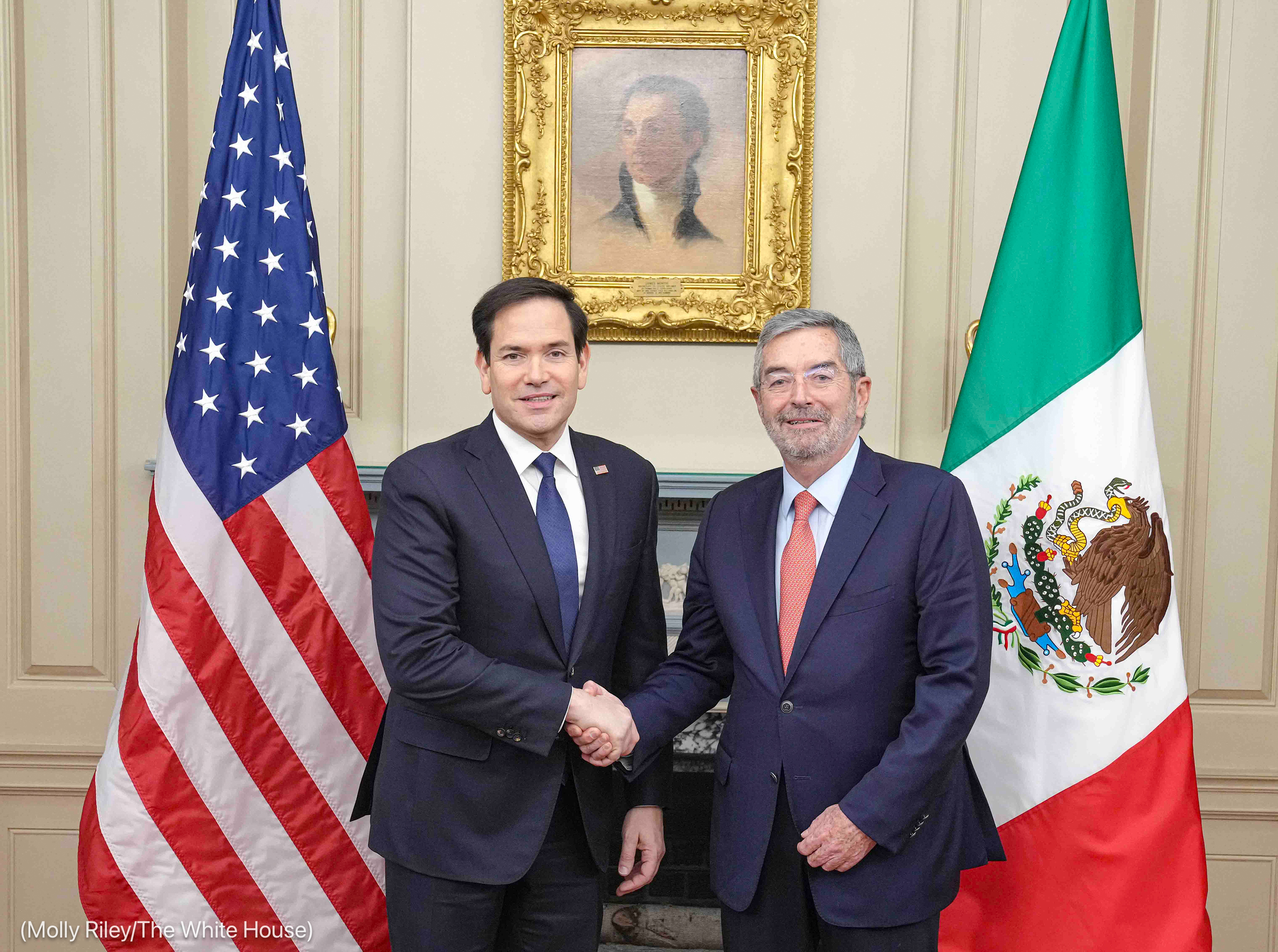
Rubio with Mexican Foreign Secretary Juan Ramón de la Fuente, February 27, 2025

On March 4, 2025, the United States imposed 25% tariffs on Mexican goods. Part of these tariffs are lifted for a month on March 6 after a telephone conversation between Trump and Mexican president Claudia Sheinbaum. Although the exemption was expected to end on April 2, the U.S. said it would continue indefinitely.

Trump said the tariffs are intended to reduce the U.S. trade deficit with Mexico, force the country to secure its border with the U.S. against illegal immigration and the smuggling of fentanyl, and encourage domestic manufacturing in the United States. The opioid epidemic in the United States is largely fueled by drugs smuggled from Mexico. In 2021 and 2022, during the worst years of the opioid epidemic, over 100,000 people in the U.S. died annually from drug overdoses.

Trump launched a process to designate Mexican drug cartels and other criminal organizations as foreign terrorist organizations. He also threatened U.S. military intervention against cartels in Mexico. During the first months of 2025, Mexico stepped up its fight against narcotraffic and immigration following Trump's statements on the subject. In particular, Mexico handed over 29 major cartel prisoners to US authorities in February 2025.

=== Honduras ===
Trump endorsed conservative candidate Nasry Asfura in the country's 2025 presidential election, with his administration pledging to reduce its foreign aid to Honduras if Asfura was not elected the country's president. During the campaign, Asfura spent time in Washington, D.C. to demonstrate his alignment with the Trump administration's foreign policy. Asfura was elected to the position in an election marred by delays in vote counting.

In December 2025, Trump pardoned former Honduran president Juan Orlando Hernández, who was serving a 45-year prison sentence in the United States for drug trafficking.

=== Panama ===
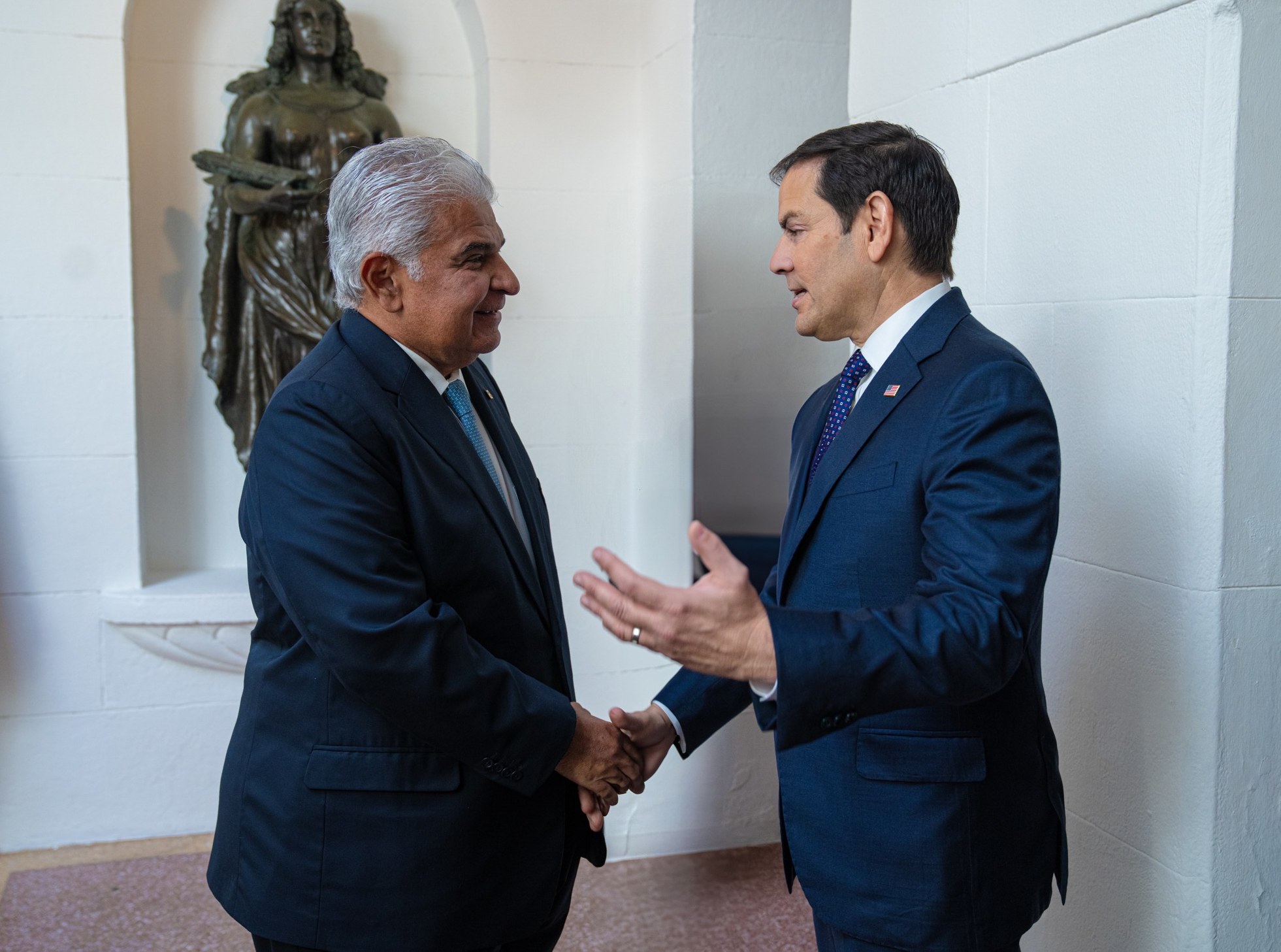
Rubio with Panamanian president José Raúl Mulino in Panama City, Panama, February 2, 2025

On March 4, 2025, Trump reiterated his intention to reassert U.S. control over the Panama Canal, alleging that Panama had violated the longstanding neutrality agreement governing its operation.

In response, Panamanian president José Raúl Mulino dismissed the remarks as false and offensive to Panama's sovereignty.

On the same day, Hong Kong-based CK Hutchison Holdings announced plans to sell its operational rights to the Balboa and Cristóbal ports, located at either end of the Panama Canal, to a consortium led by the American investment firm BlackRock.

Martín Torrijos visa was revoked.

== South America ==
=== Argentina ===
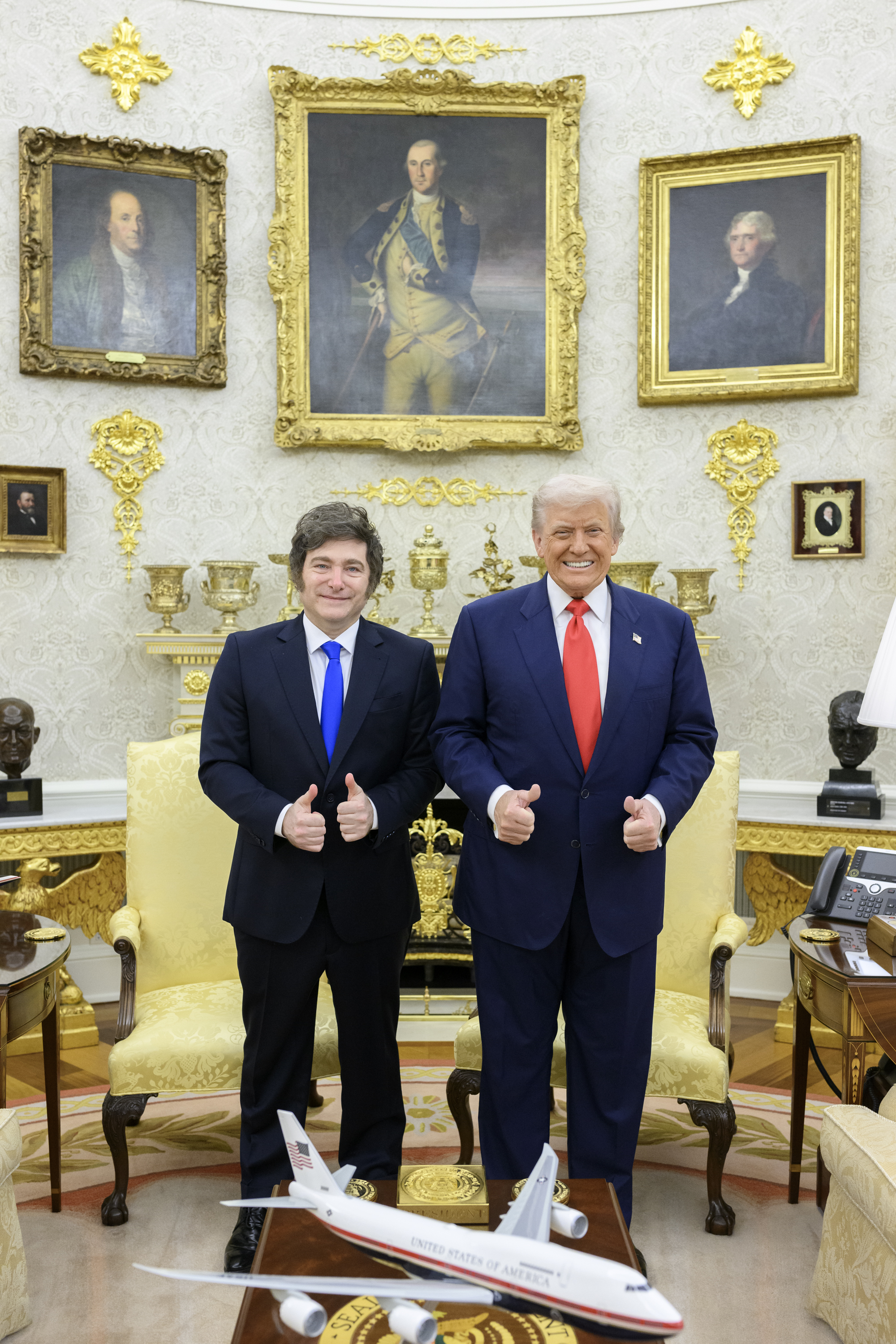
Trump and Argentine president Javier Milei, October 2025

On November 14, 2024, Argentine president Javier Milei headed to Florida to meet with Trump at Mar-a-Lago. He was the first foreign head of state to travel to the United States after Trump's victory and to meet the president-elect. Milei, an economist known for his advocacy of free-market policies and limited government, had previously expressed support for Trump and his political positions, wanting to strengthen diplomatic and economic ties between Argentina and the Western world. In a call following the election results, Trump called Milei his "favorite president" in response according to reports. The president of Argentina gave a speech at a CPAC summit in Miami. Milei also met with Department of Government Efficiency planned-directors Elon Musk and Vivek Ramaswamy to advise them on their goal to "dismantle bureaucracy", cut government spending and reorganize the federal personnel.

The treasury finalized a $20 billion currency swap framework with Argentina from the Exchange Stabilization Fund and bought Argentine pesos as part of the administration's America First policy. Bessent said "There will be no taxpayer losses. This is a swap line. This is not a bailout (...) It is not going to register a loss". About the 2025 Argentine legislative election, Trump said that "if he [Milei] wins, we're staying with him. And if he doesn't win, we're gone".

Milei's government has consistently supported the Trump administration, expressing total support for the United States military actions against Iran which unleashed the 2026 Iran war.

=== Brazil ===
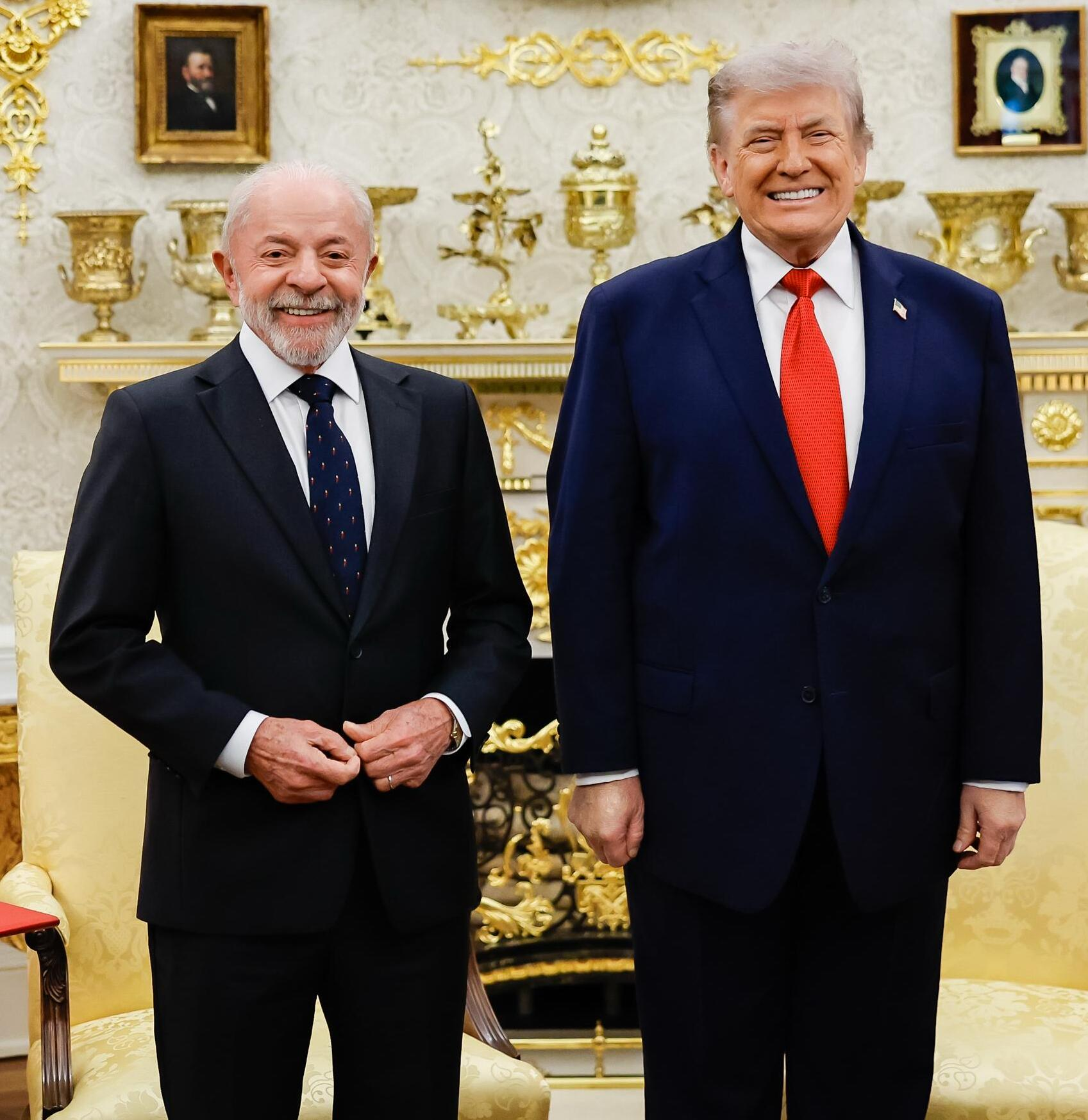
Trump and Brazilian president Luiz Inácio Lula da Silva, May 2026

Former Brazilian president Jair Bolsonaro was reportedly invited to attend the inauguration; however, Brazil's Supreme Court barred him from traveling to the United States due to ongoing legal investigations and the seizure of his passport. Justice Alexandre de Moraes ruled that Bolsonaro did not hold an official position and posed a potential flight risk. Bolsonaro had filed an appeal in an attempt to attend the event, which was denied.

The Treasury sanctioned Justice Alexandre de Moraes under the Global Magnitsky Act. Trump issued Executive Order 14323 (Addressing Threats to the United States by the Government of Brazil) which raised tariffs to 50% with a number of exemptions. The order claimed

Members of the Government of Brazil have taken actions that interfere with the economy of the United States, infringe the free expression rights of United States persons, violate human rights, and undermine the interest the United States has in protecting its citizens and companies. Members of the Government of Brazil are also politically persecuting a former President of Brazil, which is contributing to the deliberate breakdown in the rule of law in Brazil, to politically motivated intimidation in that country, and to human rights abuses.

In December 2025, sanctions on Alexandre de Moraes were lifted.

In October 2026, Trump cast doubt on the legitimacy of the 2026 Brazilian general election which Flávio Bolsonaro lost despite winning in the first round, saying that it "looked like another rigged election." Trump and his aides subsequently helped Bolsonaro flee Brazil for Florida.

=== Chile ===
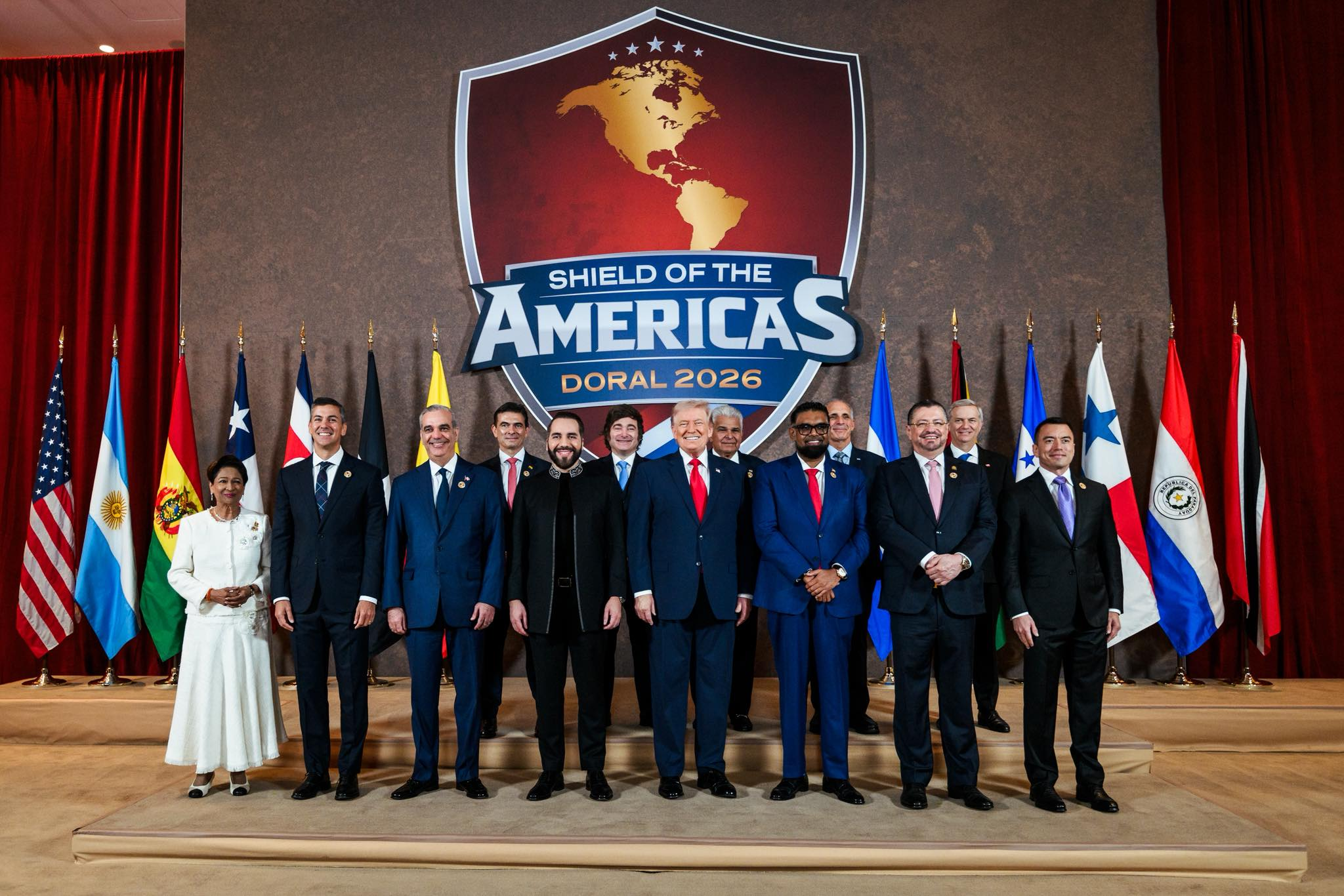
Trump, Chilean President José Antonio Kast, and other leaders during the Shield of the Americas summit, March 2026

In December 2024, Trump nominated former United States Border Patrol agent Brandon Judd as the United States ambassador to Chile. In his Senate confirmation meeting, Judd stated that he wanted to "restrict China's access to Chile's resources." In February 2026, US Secretary of State Marco Rubio announced visa restrictions against three high-ranking Chilean officials, including Minister of Transportation and Telecommunications Juan Carlos Muñoz, for a proposed project to construct a submarine fiber optic cable between Chile and China. The decision drew outrage from the Chilean government, with president Gabriel Boric condemning the Trump administration for issuing "indeterminate accusations" and "unilateral sanctions" that infringed Chile's sovereignty.

Chile's export of copper to the United States was threatened by the second Trump tariffs in early 2025. Chile supplies about 60% of US copper imports, accounting for 11.1% of the value of Chilean copper exports. Chilean state-owned miner Codelco, which sends roughly one-third of its copper exports to the US, was at first expected to lose significant revenue. The announcement of a tariff exception for cathode copper had a particularly good impact for Codelco that is a traditional supplier of cathode copper.

In March 2026 Chile signed an agreement with the United States with regards to the exploitation and commercialization of rare-earth metals. This move has been interpreted by analysts an attempt by the United States to diminish Chinese influence in the rare-earth metals market.

=== Colombia ===
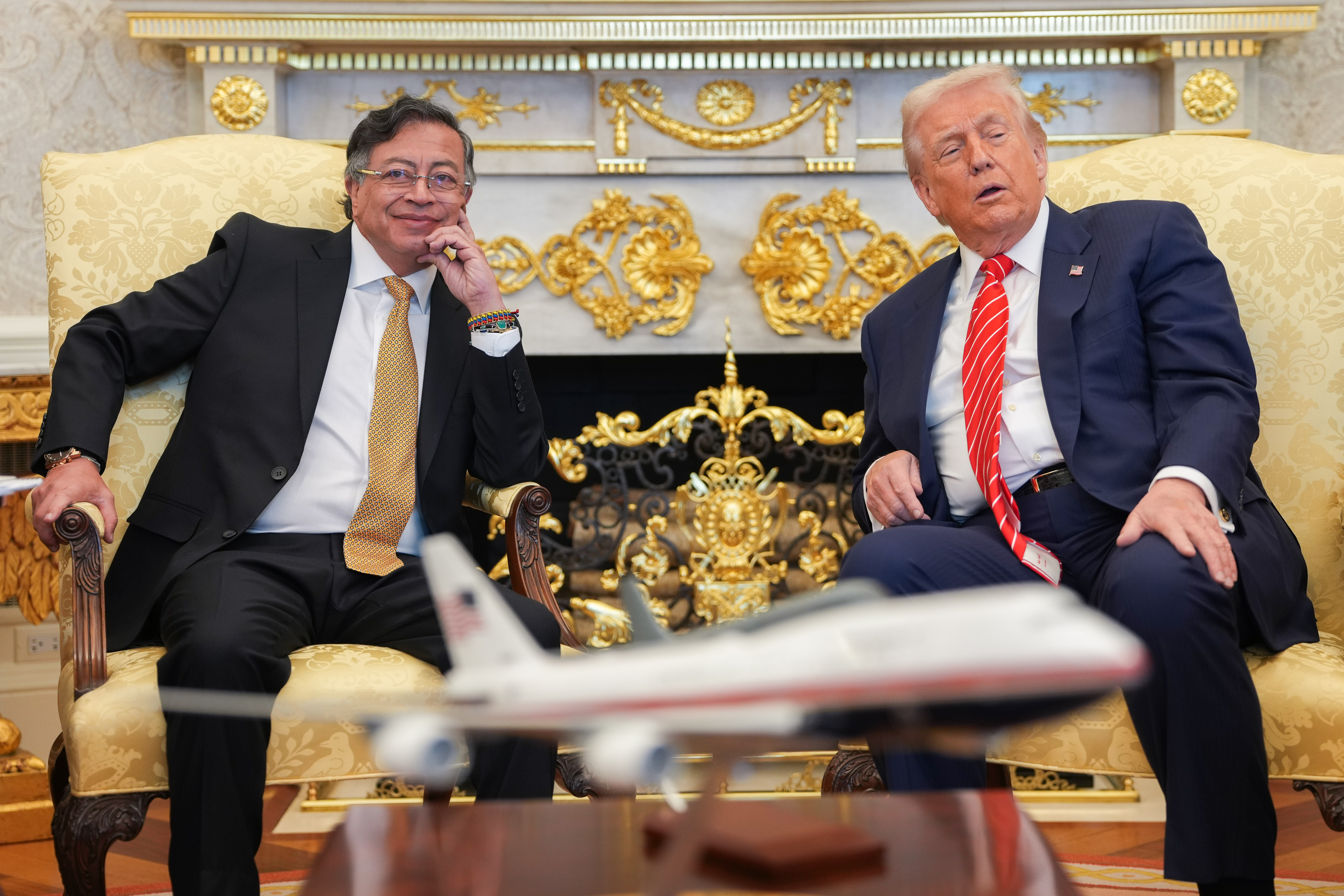
Trump and Colombian president Gustavo Petro, February 2026

In January 2025, a dispute arose between Colombia and the United States after Colombian president Gustavo Petro refused to allow two unannounced U.S. military aircraft carrying deported Colombian nationals to land. Each flight seeking to land was carrying approximately 80 Colombian deportees. Previously, scheduled commercial airlines were used routinely to deliver deported Colombian nationals to Colombia and with arrangements and preparations in advance. In response, Trump imposed emergency 25% tariffs on all Colombian imports, implemented travel bans and visa revocations for Colombian government officials, and implemented enhanced customs and border protection inspections for all Colombian nationals and cargo from Colombia. According to CNN, this was the first instance of "Trump using economic pressure to force other nations to fall in line with his mass deportation plans since he took office." Trump said he would double the tariffs to 50% in one week if Petro did not reverse his decision. The government did not go ahead with these plans after Colombia agreed to accept deported migrants without restrictions. Diplomats from both countries reached a deal which has seen Colombia send its own air force planes to collect the migrants, a process that Petro said ensured they were treated "with dignity" and without being handcuffed. The U.S. government did make concessions to Colombia by agreeing not to handcuff and photograph the deportees, and dispatching Homeland Security staffers, instead of military officers, as flight escorts.

=== Ecuador ===
In March 2026, the United States launched military operations, dubbed "Operation Total Extermination", against "designated terrorist organizations" in Ecuador.

=== Venezuela ===
President Trump addresses the nation after authorizing airstrikes against Venezuela on January 3, 2026

On March 3, 2025, the Trump administration gave Chevron Corporation 30 days to halt its activities in Venezuela. While the company produces 1/4 of the country's oil, Foreign Policy estimates that its departure from Venezuela will result in a 10% drop in GDP over the next 5 years.

In July 2025, as part of a prisoner exchange with Venezuela, Trump secured the release of Dahud Hanid Ortíz, who was convicted of triple homicide for killing three people at a law firm in Spain in connection with a marital dispute. Rubio claimed Ortíz and nine other convicts were "wrongfully detained". The decision sparked outrage in Spain and Germany, where authorities condemned the move as a grave miscarriage of justice.

On January 3, 2026, the U.S. launched an intervention, which led to the capture of President Nicolás Maduro and First Lady Cilia Flores. Following the capture, Venezuela became a de facto puppet state of the United States. The Trump administration, primarily through U.S. Secretary of State Marco Rubio, maintains control over its domestic finances, foreign policy, government appointments, revenues, and oil reserves.

== Oceania ==
=== Australia ===
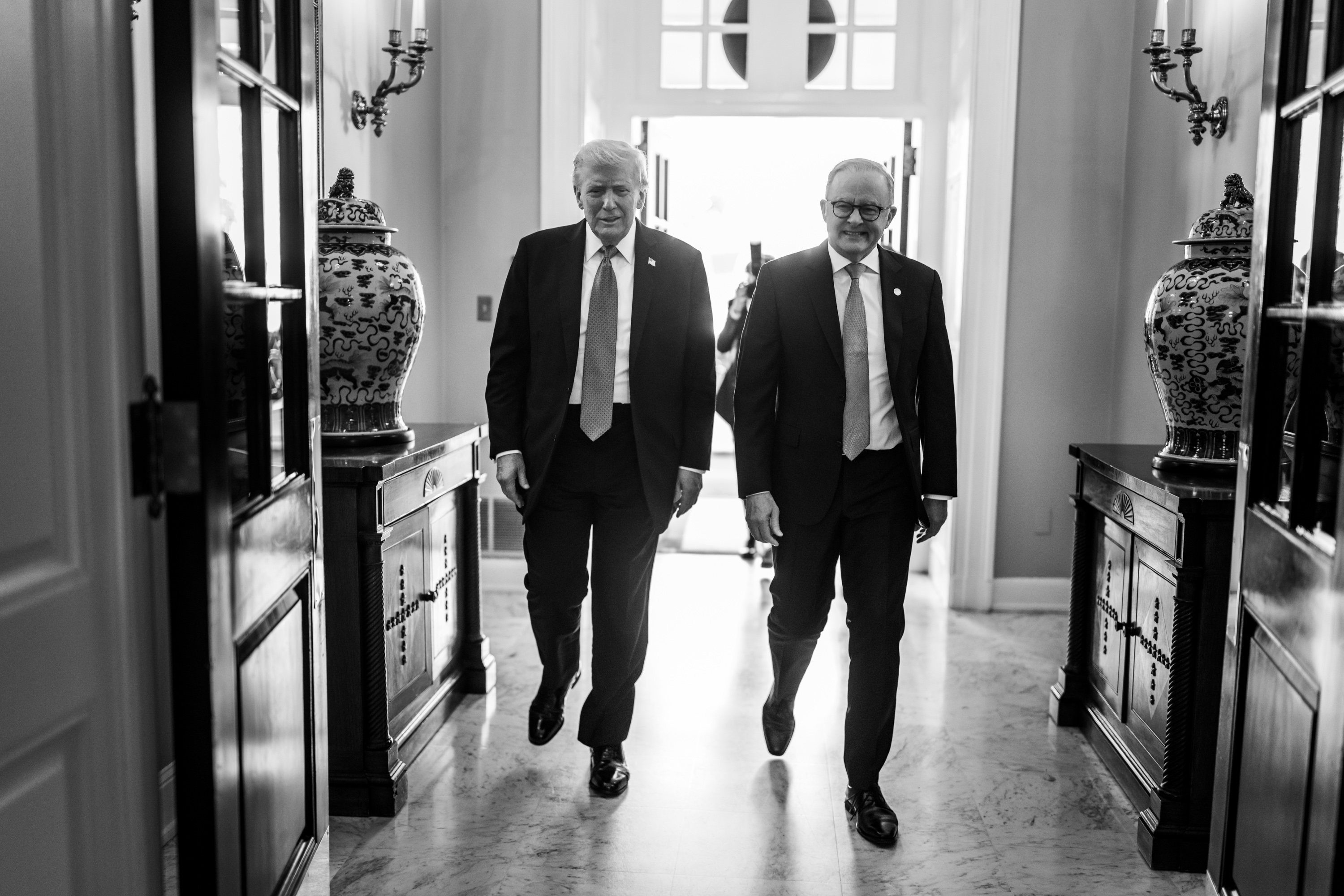
Trump and Australian prime minister Anthony Albanese, October 2025

On January 21, 2025, Rubio met with his Quad counterparts Australian Foreign Minister Penny Wong, Indian External Affairs Minister S. Jaishankar and Japanese Foreign Minister Takeshi Iwaya in Washington, DC. The four foreign ministers issued a joint statement reaffirming political, economic and defence cooperation in maintaining international free passage in the Indo-Pacific region.

On June 10, 2025, Rubio criticised the Australian, New Zealand, British, Canadian, and Norwegian governments for imposing joint travel bans on two alleged far-right Israeli government ministers Itamar Ben-Gvir and Bezalel Smotrich. Rubio affirmed US support for Israel, condemned Hamas and called on the five governments to reverse their travel sanctions on Ben-Gvir and Smotrich.

In late July 2025, Australian Agriculture Minister Julie Collins confirmed that Australia would relax biosecurity restrictions on US beef imports. This announcement was welcomed by both Trump and US Agriculture Secretary Brooke L. Rollins as a "major trade breakthrough" for US beef exporters.

On October 21, 2025, Trump signed a deal with Anthony Albanese, Prime Minister of Australia, over rare-earths and other critical minerals (Note: Rare-earth elements or minerals are distinct from minerals or materials described as critical minerals or raw materials, which refers to materials that are considered to be of strategic or economic importance to a country. There is no single list, but individual governments compile lists of materials that are critical for their own economies. However the two terms are often used interchangeably, especially in the U.S.) that are needed for commercial clean energy production and technologically advanced military hardware. They each committed to provide at least US$1bn (A$1.54bn) towards a number of projects worth $US8.5bn (A$13bn) in both countries over six months. The deal has been well received by the Australian rare-earths industry and the markets, and is important to the US because rare earths are used in many technologies, including components of the Defense Force such as F-35 fighter jets and Tomahawk missiles. The deal is also seen as a major shift in economic alliances.

=== Cook Islands ===
In early August 2025, the State Department commenced talks on research for seabed exploration and development with the Cook Islands. The Cook Islands is a self-governing state in free association with New Zealand, which is responsible for assistance in the areas of foreign affairs, defence and natural disasters. Under this arrangement, the Cook Islands has its own international legal personality and conducts its own international relations, including establishing diplomatic relations with other countries.

=== Fiji ===
In mid December 2025, the State Department threatened to downgrade Fiji to a "Tier 3" ranking in its Trafficking in Persons (TIP) report unless the Fijian government takes action against a South Korean religious cult called the Grace Road Church, which has been accused of human trafficking and forced labour. The threatened reclassification followed the escape of at least four US citizens including two children from the Grace Road Church.

=== Guam ===
As part of the second Trump administration's One Big Beautiful Bill Act, the unincorporated territory of Guam was excluded from the provisions of the Radiation Exposure Compensation Act (RECA), which allows victims of radioactive exposure within the United States to claim US$100,000 in compensation. Guamanian Republican congressman James Moylan, with the support of New Mexico Democratic congresswoman Teresa Leger Fernández, had unsuccessfully tried to incorporate an amendment into the legislation to include Guam in early July 2025.

=== New Zealand ===
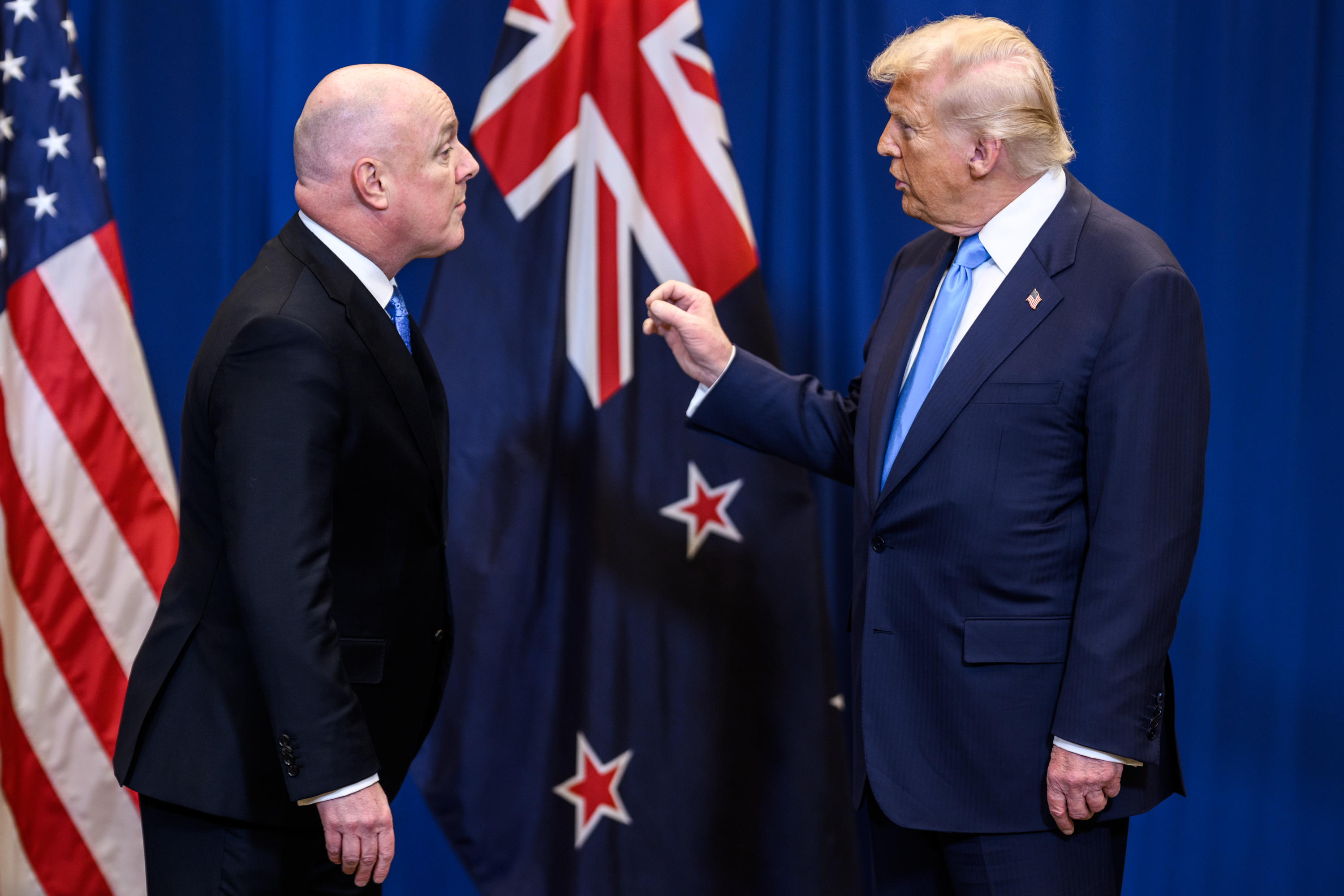
Trump and New Zealand prime minister Christopher Luxon, October 2025

In mid-March 2025, New Zealand foreign minister Winston Peters met with Rubio in Washington, DC to discuss various issues of interest to NZ-US bilateral relations including defence, security and economic cooperation in the Pacific, and New Zealand's relations with China.

Prior to the 2025 APEC Summit in late October 2025, Prime Minister Luxon had his first in-person meeting with US president Donald Trump on October 30, and invited Trump to visit New Zealand. On November 1, 2025, Luxon also met with United States Secretary of the Treasury Scott Bessent. Luxon also expressed disapproval of US plans to resume nuclear testing and reiterated his commitment to New Zealand's nuclear-free policy.

Hegseth made an effort to demand increased defence spending among the allies during the Shangri-La Dialogue in Singapore whilst labeling New Zealand a freeloader nation for a lack of such on May 29, 2026.

=== Palau ===
In late July 2025, ABC News reported that the Palauan government was considering an American offer to accept third party deportees from the United States in return for guaranteed American aid. In early October 2025, the Senate of Palau reiterated its opposition to accepting third country deportees from the United States. On December 24, 2025, Palau president Surangel Whipps Jr. announced that Palau had agreed to accept 75 third country deportees in return for US$7.5 million in aid assistance.

== Human rights ==
Prior to the release of the 2024 Country Reports on Human Rights Practices, various news outlets reported on a shift in focus in the Trump administration's coverage of human rights practices in the upcoming reports. In March 2025, Politico reported that the Trump administration would be removing sections from the reports that discussed discrimination against women, LGBTQ+ people, disabled people, and indigenous people, as well as government corruption. Their reporting also indicated that there would be limited examples of certain rights abuses. On August 6, The Washington Post reported that leaked drafts of the reports had reduced criticism of human rights abuses of El Salvador, Israel, and Russia relative to past reports, including the complete omission of references to anti-LGBTQ violence and gender-based violence. The State Department commented that the report was "restructured in a way that removes redundancies, increases report readability and is more responsive to the legislative mandate that underpins the report". On August 8, The Intercept reported that the bureau which prepares the report had been instructed not to include discussion of free and fair elections, government corruption, harassment of human rights organizations, or non-refoulement. Reporting from NPR said that instructions included removing references to gender-based violence, environmental justice, DEI, sexual violence against children, privacy interference, government corruption, restricted political participation, violence against minorities and LGBTQ+ people, and harassment of human rights organizations. The administration was also reported to consider migration, gender-transition, and public funding for abortions as human rights abuses while not considering "persecution of marginalized groups such as women, ethnic and racial minorities, people with disabilities" to focus on that "given to us by God, our creator". The administration was reported to have reduced criticism of the legitimacy of foreign elections.

On August 12, the reports were officially released with significantly less content than the previous year's. Omissions included sections on denial of fair public trials, restrictions on free assembly, election integrity, systemic racial violence, government corruption, abuses against indigenous people, abuses based on sexual orientation, and violence against women. The reports contained increased criticism for antisemitism and restrictions on freedom of expression in European countries, freedom of speech and internet freedom in Brazil, and discrimination against racial minorities in South Africa.

Trump signed Executive Order 14236 which rescinded NSM-18 and was reported to have rescinded NSM-20 both of which expanded restrictions on countries acquiring US weapons.

== Environment ==
At the UN in 2025, Trump called climate change the "greatest con job ever perpetrated on the world". There was described as being "few issues on which the United States is more diplomatically isolated from the rest of the world than climate change". The administration has pushed other countries to loosen environmental rules including threatening to retaliate against countries that voted for the IMO Net-Zero Framework and urging countries to reject the global plastic pollution treaty. The White House said that no "high-level officials" would attend COP 30.

== Trade policy ==
=== Mar-a-Lago Accord ===
The "Mar-a-Lago Accord" is a proposed international agreement conceived by Stephen Miran before joining the Trump administration. The proposed accord aims to devalue the U.S. dollar to address trade imbalances and enhance American economic competitiveness. Drawing parallels to the 1985 Plaza Accord, which successfully depreciated the dollar through coordinated efforts among major economies, the Mar-a-Lago Accord would envision a similar strategy to bolster U.S. manufacturing by making exports more competitive and reducing the trade deficit. The proposal includes measures such as restructuring U.S. debt by converting foreign-held Treasury securities into ultra-long-term bonds, thereby alleviating immediate fiscal pressures. Additionally, it suggests leveraging tariff policies to negotiate favorable currency valuations with key trading partners. It has been criticized as "QAnon for tariffs".

=== Tariff implementations ===
Trump announces his "Liberation Day" tariffs on April 2, 2025

During his second term as president of the United States, Donald Trump enacted a series of steep tariffs affecting nearly all goods imported into the country. From January to April 2025, the overall average effective US tariff rate rose from 2.5% to an estimated 27%—the highest level in over a century. After changes, negotiations, and the invalidation of certain tariffs by the Supreme Court of the United States, the overall average effective tariff rate was 12.1% as of July 21, 2026. The items most affected by the tariffs are metals, items mostly made of metal, and vehicles.

Although the Constitution of the United States grants Congress the sole authority to levy taxes—including tariffs—since 1930, Congress has passed laws allowing the president to impose tariffs unilaterally for national security reasons.

Under Section 232 of the 1962 Trade Expansion Act, Trump raised tariffs on cars, steel, aluminum, copper, and related derivative products as high as 50%. New tariffs on large-scale batteries, cast iron and iron fittings, plastic piping, industrial chemicals and power grid and telecom equipment are under consideration.

In April 2025, Trump also claimed unprecedented authority under the International Emergency Economic Powers Act (IEEPA) to impose Liberation Day tariffs of at least 10% on goods from nearly all countries. Trump also used the law to impose punitive tariffs against several countries and to order the early closure of the de minimis exemption. In February 2026, the Supreme Court ruled the IEEPA tariffs illegal in the case Learning Resources, Inc. v. Trump. The government collected an estimated $166 billion in IEEPA tariffs from more than 330,000 businesses that was required to be refunded.

After the decision of the Supreme Court, Trump announced a global tariff of 10% under Section 122 of the Trade Act of 1974, to remain in effect for 150 days, until July 24, 2026. After a lawsuit, the United States Court of International Trade ruled that these tariffs are also illegal and the case is being appealed.

Trump invoked Section 301 of the Trade Act of 1974, which allows the USTR to investigate and penalize foreign trade practices deemed unfair, to impose or threaten tariffs on goods produced using forced labor in 60 countries. He also used Section 338 of the Tariff Act of 1930 (Smoot–Hawley) to impose tariffs of 50% on motor vehicles, dairy, and alcohol imports from Canada, not presently effective.

The Trump administration argues that its tariffs will promote domestic manufacturing, protect national security, and substitute for federal income taxes. The administration views trade deficits as inherently harmful, a stance economists criticized as a flawed understanding of trade. Studies have shown that the tariffs have increased expenses and reduced earnings for companies, and have increased costs for households. The promised growth in manufacturing jobs has not been realized. Corporate bankruptcies increased to the highest level since 2010. However, although many economists predicted slower growth and even a possible recession due to the tariffs, US GDP has continued to grow. This was partially attributed to Trump's backtracking on the initial high tariff rates. There has also been no definitive indication of a significant aggregate effect on the labor market so far; however, industries most exposed to tariffs show some signs of weakness relative to the pre-2025 trend.

On March 4, 2025, President Trump imposed tariffs on Canada (25% on imports, 10% on energy), Mexico (25% on imports), and China (increased tariffs from 10% to 20%). These measures aimed to pressure these countries to combat the production and distribution of fentanyl, addressing the U.S. opioid crisis. This led to a sharp decline in U.S. stock markets and warnings from retailers about rising consumer prices. In retaliation, Canada imposed 25% tariffs on $155 billion of U.S. goods, China placed 10-15% tariffs on U.S. agricultural products, and Mexico announced forthcoming countermeasures. These actions have escalated global trade tensions, affecting markets and economies worldwide.

Starting on August 24, 2026, the US and Canadian governments started trading barbs over the respective trade and tariff policies towards the other and Trump insulted Doug Ford. Canada began retaliatory measures against US imports. Trump then escalated the situation by calling to relabel Lake Ontario as Lake America.

== Expansionism ==
Asked: Are there limits on your global power?

Yeah, there is one thing. My own morality. My own mind. It's the only thing that can stop me. I don't need international law. I'm not looking to hurt people.

— Donald Trump, January 7, 2026

New York Times White House corrspondents wrote that "Mr. Trump's assessment... was the most blunt acknowledgment yet of his worldview. At its core is the concept that national strength, rather than laws, treaties and conventions, should be the deciding factor as powers collide."

In the lead-up to his second inauguration, Trump proposed plans and ideas that would expand the United States' political influence and territory. The last territory acquired by the United States was in 1947 when the Mariana, Caroline, and Marshall Islands were acquired.

After the 2026 United States strikes in Venezuela and amid questions of what would come next, Stephen Miller explained the administration's foreign policy by saying "We're a superpower. And under President Trump, we are going to conduct ourselves as a superpower."

=== Canada ===
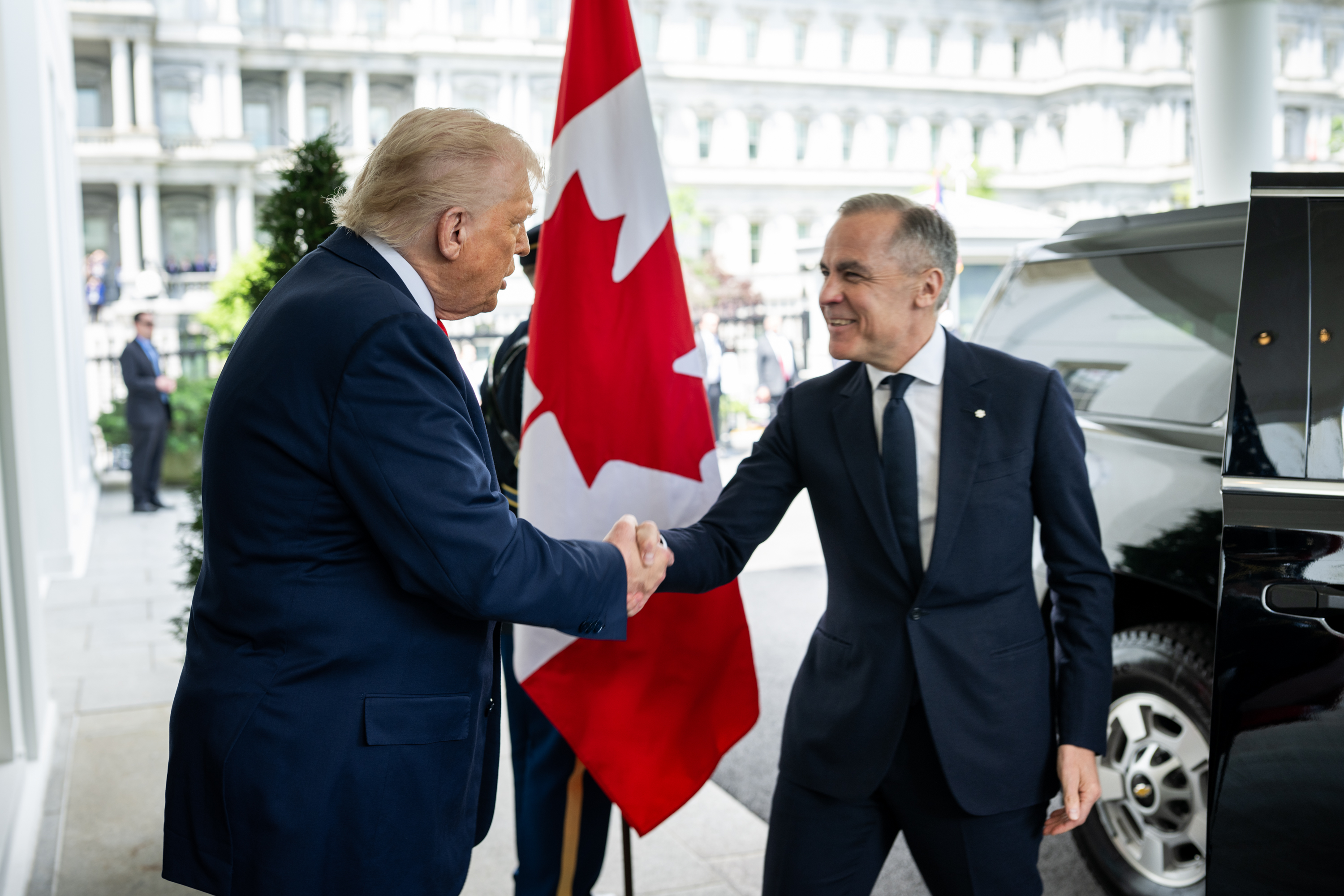
Trump with Canadian prime minister Mark Carney, May 2025

Trump has made repeated calls for Canada to become the 51st state of the United States. He initially raised this concept in a December 2024 summit with Canadian prime minister Justin Trudeau and other Canadian government officials; the officials initially interpreted it as a joke. In January 2025, shortly before taking office, Trump continued this rhetoric, stating that he would use "economic force", but not military force, to annex Canada.

Trump made repeated allusions to the topic of Canadian annexation throughout his first month in office, and signed an executive order to impose blanket 25 percent tariffs on all Canadian imports. The executive order cited illegal border crossings and the fentanyl crisis as the reasons for the tariffs, though Canada is responsible for about 1.5 percent of illegal migrants and less than one percent of all fentanyl seized at the border. On Truth Social, Trump shared his disapproval of the U.S. trade deficit with Canada. When asked by a reporter what Canada could do to avoid the tariffs, he again raised the idea of the U.S. annexing the nation as its 51st state.

Canada promised more than $150 billion CAD in retaliatory tariffs, and provincial responses included Ontario proposing billions of dollars in tax deferrals and payouts to stem the economic fallout from the blanket tariffs. Shortly before they were set to take effect, Trump reached an agreement with Trudeau to temporarily delay his blanket tariffs for 30 days. Shortly afterward, he made plans to impose steel and aluminum tariffs with significant impacts on Canada.

Afterward, Trump continued to insist that Canada could become the 51st state. In an interview preceding Super Bowl LIX, Fox News journalist Bret Baier asked Trump if he was serious about his proposals to make Canada a U.S. state; Trump said that he was indeed serious. Trudeau was caught in a private meeting imploring private-sector leaders to take Trump's annexation threats seriously.

Polling showed that the vast majority of Canadians opposed the idea of joining the U.S. Canadian flag sales increased in the early months of 2025, and Ontario premier Doug Ford helped popularize a "Canada Is Not For Sale" baseball cap resembling Trump's famous Make America Great Again caps. In February, all 13 Canadian premiers visited Washington, D.C. together to argue for the permanent postponement of the tariff plans.

=== Greenland ===
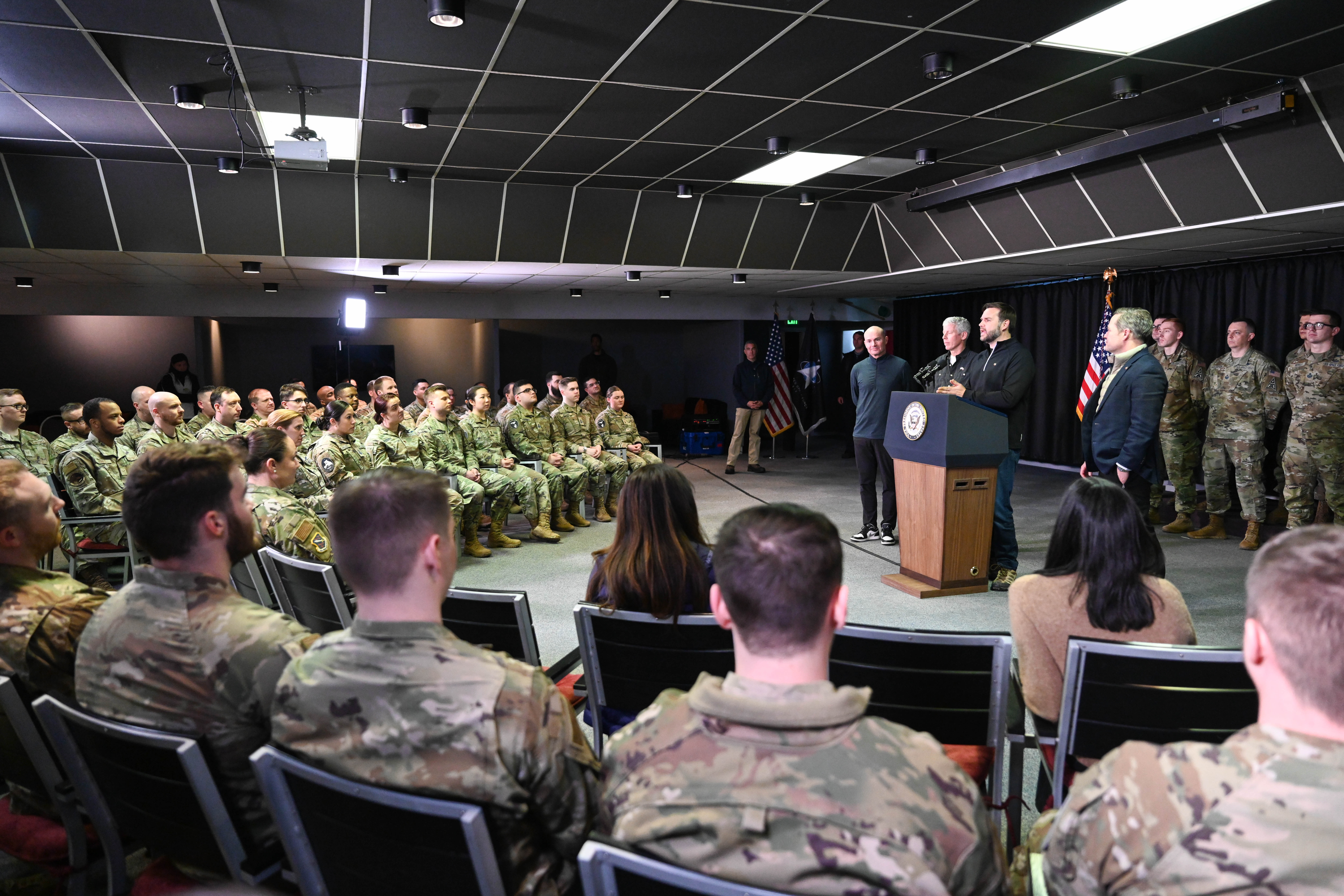
Vice President JD Vance at Pituffik Space Base in Greenland, March 28, 2025

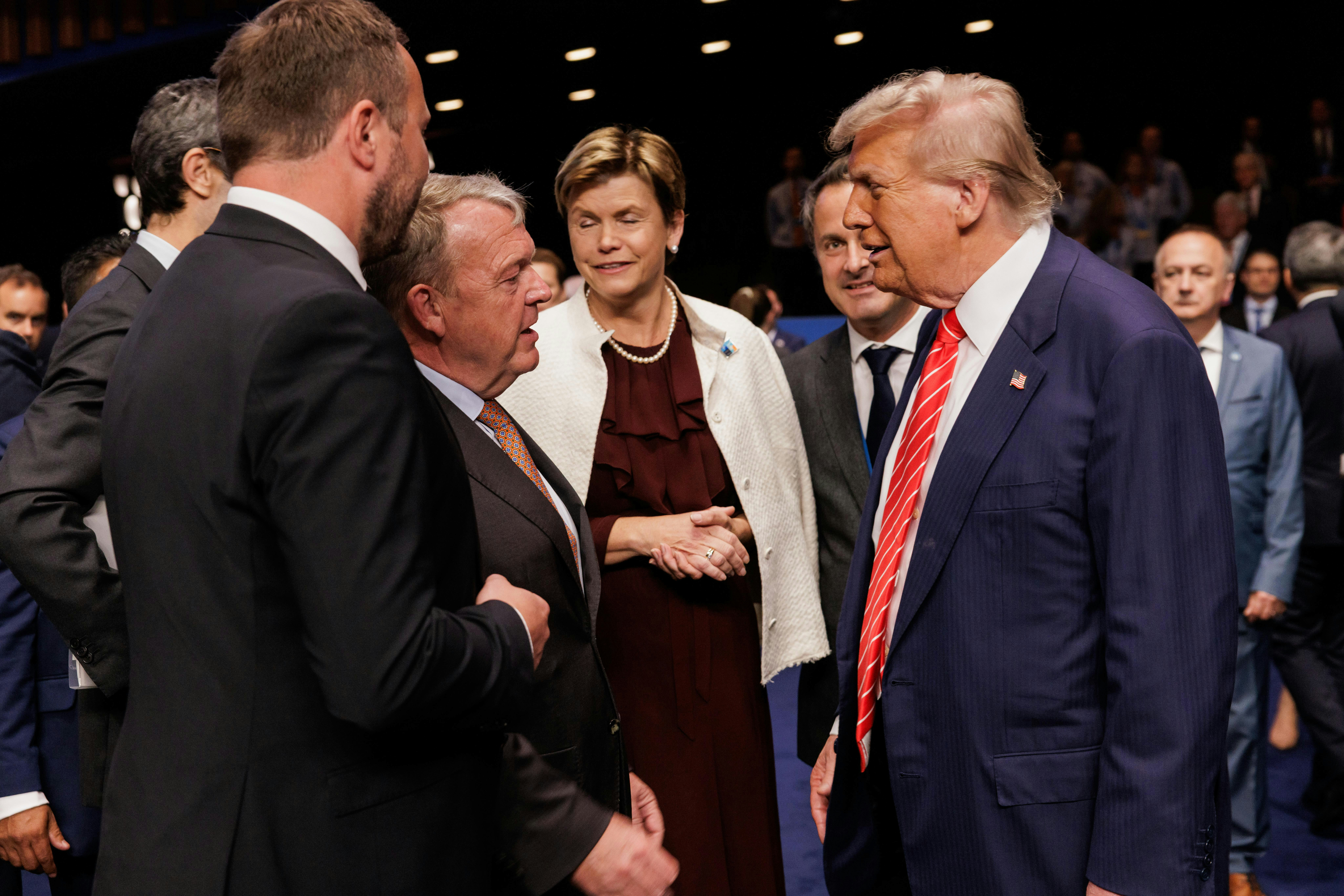
Trump and Danish Foreign Minister Lars Løkke Rasmussen at NATO summit in The Hague, June 25, 2025

In December 2024, Trump stated a further proposal for the United States to purchase Greenland from Denmark, describing ownership and control of the island as "an absolute necessity" for national security purposes. This builds upon a prior offer from Trump to buy Greenland during his first term, which the Danish Realm refused, causing him to cancel his August 2019 visit to Denmark. On January 7, 2025, Trump's son Donald Trump Jr. visited Greenland's capital city Nuuk alongside Charlie Kirk to hand out MAGA hats. At a press conference the following day, Trump refused to rule out military or economic force to take over Greenland or the Panama Canal. However, he did rule out military force in taking over Canada. On January 14, the Trump-affiliated Nelk Boys also visited Nuuk, handing out dollar bills to locals. On January 16, the CEOs of major Danish companies Novo Nordisk, Vestas and Carlsberg among others were assembled for a crisis meeting in the Ministry of State to discuss the situation. On the subsequent day, former chief executive Friis Arne Petersen in the Danish Ministry of Foreign Affairs described the situation as "historically unheard of", while Noa Redington, special adviser to former prime minister Helle Thorning-Schmidt, compared the international pressure on Denmark with that during the 2005 Jyllands-Posten Muhammad cartoons controversy.

On 10 February 2025, Representative Buddy Carter introduced a proposal for legislation which would rename Greenland to "Red, White, and Blueland" and allow President Trump to "purchase or otherwise acquire" Greenland. Carter further stated, "When our Negotiator-in-Chief signs this historic agreement, we will proudly welcome the people of what is now Greenland to join the freest nation in history. President Trump has rightly identified this purchase as a national security priority." The legislation gives the office of the US secretary of the interior six months after its passage to ensure that federal documents are updated to reflect the name change. The Danish MEP Anders Vistisen commented on the proposed bill with the statement: "There is clearly a need for more adults in the room when the U.S. administration formulates foreign policy."

In March 2025, President Trump renewed calls to annex Greenland, calling it vital to U.S. and global security. Vice President JD Vance, during a visit to the Pituffik Space Base, accused Denmark of underinvesting in Greenland's defense and encouraged a shift toward U.S. partnership. Denmark's foreign minister condemned the administration's tone, while Trump said he preferred diplomacy but would not rule out military action. Greenlandic leaders rejected the annexation effort, formed a coalition government to oppose it, and protests erupted in Copenhagen. U.S. House Democrats introduced a bill to block the use of force, and NATO clarified it would not support any territorial acquisition. While in the midst of a campaign against Venezuela and its leader Nicolas Maduro and ushering threats against Columbia and maybe Mexico Trump amplified his preceding statements supporting the US takeover of Greenland. "I have to say this very directly to the United States: It makes absolutely no sense to talk about the need for the United States to take over Greenland," Danish prime minister Mette Frederiksen uttered as a response on Facebook. British prime minister Keir Starner also decried Trump's push for territory. Trump called anything but a total takeover of Greenland "unacceptable" ahead of a meeting of the foreign ministers of both the U.S. and Denmark thus further straining the relations without the meeting having taken place yet. On January 16, 2026, Trump stated that he will seek retaliatory tariffs on countries that ally with Denmark concerning Greenland. Meanwhile, US senator Don Bacon claimed that Trump's desire for territory would be unintelligent.

=== Panama Canal ===
Donald Trump, Panamanian President José Raúl Mulino, Salvadoran President Nayib Bukele and other leaders in Doral, Florida, March 7, 2026

In 2024, Trump demanded that Panama return control of the Panama Canal to the United States due to "excessive rates" being charged for American passage. The United States previously was in control of the Panama Canal Zone from 1903 until 1999, and has invaded Panama before in 1989.

In March 2025, a consortium led by BlackRock acquired a majority stake in CK Hutchison Holdings' port operations, including the ports of Balboa and Cristobal at the Panama Canal, for $22.8 billion. Trump praised the acquisition, suggesting it marked progress in "reclaiming the Panama Canal." Panama's government, however, emphasized continued Panamanian sovereignty over the canal and its administration.

=== Gaza ===
In February 2025, Trump said that the United States "will take over Gaza", sending troops "if necessary". During a joint press conference with Israeli prime minister Benjamin Netanyahu, Trump proposed that the US government "take over" Gaza, force all two million of its Palestinian residents into neighboring countries, and develop it into a "Riviera of the Middle East". To do so, Trump did not rule out using the American military. António Guterres, Secretary-General of the UN, criticized the plan, labeling it "ethnic cleansing". A few days after his comments about taking over Gaza, Trump stated that Israel would hand over Gaza to the US after the fighting was ended and the Gazan population was resettled elsewhere, which would negate the need for US troops in Gaza. Trump's proposal to resettle Palestinians from Gaza was supported by Netanyahu, Israeli Defense Minister Israel Katz, Israeli opposition leader Yair Lapid, and the majority of the Israeli public. Trump subsequently said that Palestinians resettled from Gaza as part of this plan would not be allowed to return there.

On February 21, 2025, after opposition from Arab states, Trump said he would "recommend" — but was "not forcing" — his plan for the US takeover of Gaza and the resettlement of the Palestinian population.

== United Nations ==
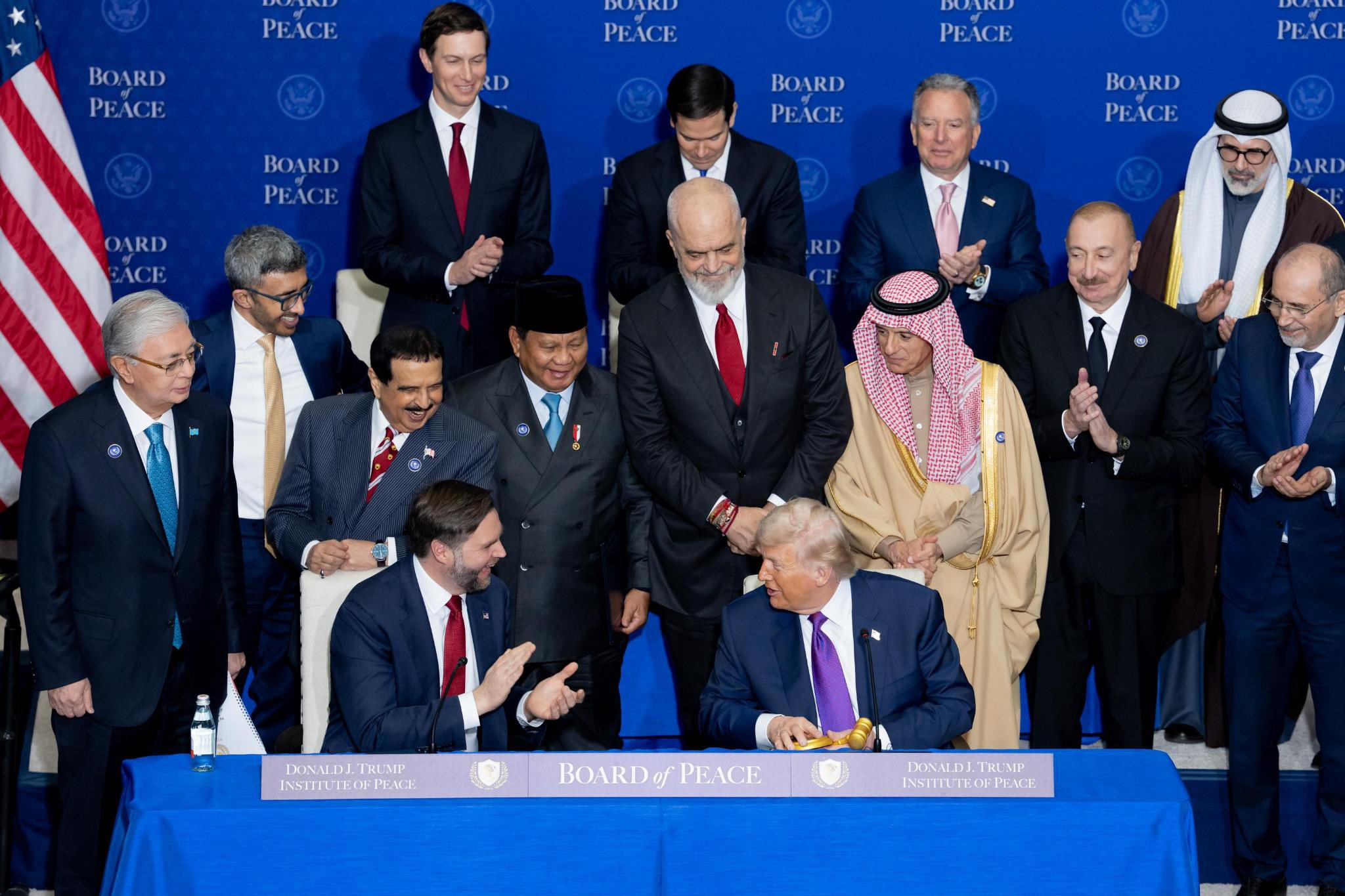
Trump, Indonesian President Prabowo Subianto, Azerbaijani President Ilham Aliyev, and other leaders during the Board of Peace meeting, February 20, 2026

On July 22, 2025, the United States informed of its decision to withdraw from UNESCO, effective December 31, 2026.

In a presidential memorandum issued on January 7, 2026, Donald Trump directed to start the process of withdrawal of the US from the 66 organizations, agencies and commissions of the United Nations, including UN Framework Convention on Climate Change (UNFCCC), calling them "contrary to the interests of the United States".

== Health ==
=== Abortion ===
The administration reinstated the Mexico City policy (global gag rule), signed Enforcing the Hyde Amendment and rejoined the Geneva Consensus Declaration.

=== America First Global Health Strategy ===
On September 18, 2025, the State Department unveiled the Trump administration's America First Global Health Strategy, which replaced the former USAID's foreign health aid programme. The America First Global Health Strategy would refocus American foreign health assistance around multiyear bilateral agreements with recipient countries, with the stated goal of reducing waste and advancing US priorities. By December 23, the United States signed bilateral health agreements with nine African countries including Kenya, Nigeria, Rwanda, Uganda, Cameroon, Eswatini, Lesotho, Liberia and Mozambique. The US$2 billion five-year Nigerian aid agreement would prioritise Christian faith-based health providers as part of the Trump Administrations' efforts to protect Nigerian Christian communities. Meanwhile, Mozambique received US$1.8 billion for HIV and malaria programs; Lesotho receive US$232 million; Eswatini received US$205 million to support public health data systems, disease surveillance and outbreak responses; Rwanda signed a US$228 million health pact; and Uganda signed a US$2.3 billion health deal.

On 26 February 2026, the United States announced that it would reduce health assistance to Zimbabwe after negotiations on a US-funded bilateral aid agreement collapse due to the Zimbabwean government refusing to share sensitive health data, including virus samples and epidemiological information. Zimbabwean president Emmerson Mnangagwa terminated negotiations on the grounds that the United States government had refused to guarantee access to vaccines, diagnostics and treatments in response to gaining access to Zimbabwean health data. By late February 2026, the State Department had signed bilateral health agreements with 19 countries, including a $1.2 billion health partnership with the Democratic Republic of Congo. On February 27, Africa Centres for Disease Control and Prevention director-general Dr. Jean Kaseya expressed concerns about provisions in some agreements requiring recipient countries to share data with the United States about virus outbreaks as a condition for receiving funding. On May 2, Ghana exited negotiations on a bilateral health agreement with the United States due to concerns about sharing Ghanaian health data with American entities without necessary safeguards and the deal requiring Ghana to bypass parliamentary ratification; conditions that would violate Ghanaian law and its constitution.

=== World Health Organization ===
Trump gave formal notice on his first day in office in 2025 that the US would withdraw from the World Health Organization. The withdrawal took effect in January 2026, with the administration stating it would not rejoin or participate as an observer and would instead pursue bilateral cooperation on global health issues, while refusing payment of approximately $260 million in outstanding fees. According to the Department of Health and Human Services, the government ended its funding contributions to the organization with Trump pausing the future transfer of any government resources to the WHO because the organization had cost the US "trillions of dollars."

Lawrence Gostin, founding director of the O'Neill Institute for Global Health Law at Georgetown University, described the move as a clear violation of US law, while suggesting that Trump would likely "get away with it." Bill Gates said he did not expect the US to reconsider its decision in the short term.

The withdrawal occurred ahead of the WHO's annual meeting to select strains for flu vaccine, in which the US had historically played a major role. At the time, the country was experiencing a severe flu season, with the CDC estimating 18 million cases and nearly 10,000 deaths, including 32 children.

== International Criminal Court ==
Trump has continued the hostility towards the International Criminal Court present in his first term. On February 6, 2025, President Trump signed Executive Order 14203, imposing targeted sanctions and visa restrictions on personnel of the court. The administration later followed up with specific sanctioning of four ICC judges on June 5 of that year. On July 13, 2026, Secretary Rubio, in an op-ed for The Wall Street Journal, announced that the Trump administration began a diplomatic push to "dismantle" the ICC. On October 9, 2026, the US sanctioned the ICC, stating that it will never allow the court to prosecute American soldiers.

== Polling ==
=== Iran ===
Prior to the 2025 United States strikes on Iranian nuclear sites, A poll of Trump voters found 53% said the U.S. should not get involved in the Iran–Israel conflict. A separate poll (prior to June 18, 2025) by The Washington Post found 45% of respondents opposed the U.S. military launching airstrikes against Iran, and a further 30% were unsure; 25% supported a military response. A CNN poll conducted by SSRS after the airstrikes showed that a majority of Americans disapproved of Trump's decision to launch airstrikes against Iran by a margin of 56% to 44%.

After the 2026 Iran war, a poll by The Guardian showed 27% of Americans approved of the US operation while 43% disapproved and 29% were not sure. Another by CNN found that 59% of Americans disapproved of the strikes, only 41% approved.

=== Venezuela ===
After the 2026 United States intervention in Venezuela, a poll by Reuters surveying 1,248 adults in the United States found that 33% of Americans approved of the military action, while 34% did not; 65% of Republicans supported the action compared to 11% of Democrats, and 72% of Americans were concerned that the US would get too involved in Venezuela, including 54% of Republicans.

== See also ==
- List of international presidential trips made by Donald Trump
- List of international trips made by Marco Rubio as United States Secretary of State
- Second Cold War – Term referring to heightened tensions in the 21st century
- Immigration policy of the second Trump administration
- Economic policy of the second Trump administration
- Powers of the president of the United States § Constraints on presidential power
