= Executive Order 14353 =

US security guarantee for Qatar

- Long title: Assuring the Security of the State of Qatar

Legislative history
- Signed into law by President Donald Trump on September 29, 2025

Executive Order 14353, titled Assuring the Security of the State of Qatar, is an executive order signed by U.S. President Donald Trump on September 29, 2025. The order establishes a policy under which the United States would regard an armed attack on Qatar as a threat to its own security and directs federal agencies to coordinate measures, including diplomatic, economic, and military responses, in such an event.

== Background ==
The order was issued in the context of longstanding security cooperation between the United States and Qatar, including the hosting of U.S. forces and joint regional operations. The order followed an Israeli airstrike in Doha that raised concerns in Washington due to the close U.S. - Qatar relationship and the presence of a major U.S. military base in the country.
